In ancient Greek religion and mythology, Helios is the god and personification of the Sun. His name is also Latinized as Helius, and he is often given the epithets Hyperion ("the one above") and Phaethon ("the shining"). Helios is often depicted in art with a radiant crown and driving a horse-drawn chariot through the sky. He was a guardian of oaths and also the god of sight. Though Helios was a relatively minor deity in Classical Greece, his worship grew more prominent in late antiquity thanks to his identification with several major solar divinities of the Roman period, particularly Apollo and Sol. The Roman Emperor Julian made Helios the central divinity of his short-lived revival of traditional Roman religious practices in the 4th century AD.

Helios figures prominently in several works of Greek mythology, poetry, and literature, in which he is often described as the son of the Titans Hyperion and Theia and brother of the goddesses Selene (the Moon) and Eos (the Dawn). Helios' most notable role in Greek mythology is the story of his mortal son Phaethon who asked his father for a favour; Helios agreed, but then Phaethon asked for the privilege to drive his four-horse fiery chariot across the skies for a single day. Although Helios warned his son again and again against this choice, explaining to him the dangers of such a journey that no other god but him was capable to bring about, Phaethon was hard to deter, and thus Helios was forced to hand him the reins. As expected, the ride was disastrous and Zeus struck the youth with one of his lightning bolts to stop him from burning or freezing the earth beyond salvation. Other than this myth, Helios occasionally appears in myths of other characters, witnessing oaths or interacting with other gods and mortals.

In the Homeric epics, his most notable role is the one he plays in the Odyssey, where Odysseus' men despite his warnings impiously kill and eat his sacred cattle the god kept at Thrinacia, his sacred island. Once informed of their misdeed, Helios in wrath asks Zeus to punish those who wronged him, and Zeus agreeing strikes their ship with a thunderbolt, killing everyone, except for Odysseus himself, the only one who had not harmed the god's cattle, and was allowed to live. After that, Helios troubles Odysseus no more in his journey.

Due to his position as the sun, he was believed to be an all-seeing witness, and thus was often invoked in oaths. He also played a significant part in ancient magic and spells. In art he is usually depicted as a beardless youth in a chiton holding a whip and driving his quadriga, accompanied by various other celestial gods such as Selene, Eos, or the stars. In ancient times he was worshipped in several places of ancient Greece, though his major cult centers were the island of Rhodes, of which he was patron god, Corinth and the greater Corinthia region. The Colossus of Rhodes, a gigantic statue of the god, adorned the port of Rhodes until it was destroyed in an earthquake, thereupon it was not built again.

Name

Etymology and variants 
The Greek gender view of the world was also present in their language. Ancient Greek had three genders (masculine, feminine and neuter), so when an object or a concept was personified as a deity, it inherited the gender of the relevant noun; helios is a masculine noun, so the god embodying it is also by necessity male. The Greek  (from earlier  /hāwelios/) is the inherited word for the Sun from Proto-Indo-European * which is cognate with Latin sol, Sanskrit surya, Old English swegl, Old Norse sól, Welsh haul, Avestan hvar, etc. In Homeric Greek his name is spelled , Ēélios, with the Doric spelling of that being , Aélios. The female offspring of Helios were called Heliades, the male Heliadae.

Other meanings 
Plato in his dialogue Cratylus suggested several etymologies for the word, proposing among others a connection, via the Doric form of the word halios, to the words , halízein, meaning collecting men when he rises, or from the phrase , aeí heileín, "ever turning" because he always turns the earth in his course:

Doric Greek retained Proto-Greek long *ā as α, while Attic changed it in most cases, including in this word, to η.
Cratylus and the etymologies Plato gives are contradicted by modern scholarship. From helios comes the modern English prefix helio-, meaning "pertaining to the Sun", used in compounds word such as heliocentrism, aphelion, heliotropium, heliophobia (fear of the sun) and heliolatry ("sun-worship").

Origins

Proto-Indo-European origin 

Helios most likely is Proto-Indo-European in origin. Walter Burkert wrote that "... Helios, the sun god, and Eos-Aurora, the goddess of the dawn, are of impeccable Indo-European lineage both in etymology and in their status as gods" and might have played a role in PIE poetry. The imagery surrounding a chariot-driving solar deity is likely Indo-European in origin. Greek solar imagery begins with the gods Helios and Eos, who are brother and sister, and who become in the day-and-night- cycle the day (hemera) and the evening (hespera), as she accompanies him in his journey across the skies. At night, he pastures his steeds and travels east in a golden boat. In them evident is the Indo-European grouping of a sun god and his sister, and the equine pair.

The name Helen is thought to share the same etymology as Helios and may express an early alternate personification of the sun among Hellenic peoples. The Proto-Indo-European sun goddess's name *Seh₂ul has been reconstructed based on several solar mythological figures, like Helios and Helen, the Germanic Sól, the Roman Sol, and others, all of which are considered derivatives of this proto-sun goddess. In PIE mythology, the Sun, a female figure, was seen as a pair with the Moon, a male figure, which in Greek mythology is recognized in the female deity Selene, usually united in marriage. Martin L. West proposed the reconstruction of a PIE suffix -nā, so that Helena's name would roughly translate to "mistress of sunlight", connecting to "hḗlios" and denoting the goddess controlling the natural element. Helen might have originally been considered to be a daughter of the Sun, as she hatched from an egg and was given tree worship, features associated with the PIE Sun Maiden;  in surviving Greek tradition however Helen is never said to be Helios' daughter, instead being the daughter of Zeus, except in one late and extremely disreputable source, Ptolemaeus Chennus.

Although the Mycenaean Greek word has been reconstructed as *hāwélios, no unambiguous attestations of the word and the god for the sun have been discovered so far in Linear B tablets. It has been proposed that in the Mycenaean pantheon existed a female sun goddess, ancestor/predecessor to Helios and closely related to Helen of Troy. While Helen was not a goddess in the homeric epics, she was worshipped as one in Laconia and in Rhodes, where Helios was also a major deity; those cults had not risen out of the epic myth, rather they had been so from the start.

Phoenician influence 
It has been suggested that the Phoenicians brought over the cult of their patron god Baal among others (such as Astarte) to Corinth, who was then continued to be worshipped under the native name/god Helios, similarly to how Astarte was worshipped as Aphrodite, and the Phoenician Melqart was adopted as the sea-god Melicertes/Palaemon, who also had a significant cult in the isthmus of Corinth.

Egyptian influence 
Helios' journey on a chariot during the day and travel with a boat in the ocean at night is likely a reflection of the Egyptian sun god Ra sailing across the skies in a barque and through the body of the sky goddess Nut to be reborn at dawn each morning anew; both gods were known as the (all-seeing in Helios's case) Eye of the Heaven in their respective pantheons.

Description 

Helios is the son of Hyperion and Theia, or Euryphaessa, or Aethra, or Basileia, the only brother of the goddesses Eos and Selene. If the order of mention of the three siblings is meant to be taken as their birth order, then out of the four authors that give him and his sisters a birth order, two make him the oldest child, one the middle, and the other the youngest. Helios was not among the regular and more prominent deities, rather he was a more shadowy member of the Olympian circle, though in spite of him being a relatively marginal god, he was one of the most ancient ones, and one that the other gods did not want to meddle with. From his lineage, Helios might thus be described as a second generation Titan, but the ancient Greeks were fairly vague on the matter. Homer in the Odyssey calls him Helios Hyperion (literally "the Sun up above"), with Hyperion used in a patronymic sense to Helios. In the Odyssey, Theogony and the Homeric Hymn to Demeter, Helios is once in each work called  (Hyperionídēs, "the son of Hyperion") and this example is followed by many later poets (like Pindar), who distinguish between Helios and Hyperion; in later literature the two gods are distinctly father and son. In literature, it is not uncommon for authors to use "Hyperion's bright son" instead of his proper name when referring to the Sun. He is associated with harmony and order, both in the sense of society and the literal movement of the celestial bodies; in this regard, he resembles Apollo, a god he was very often identified with.

Helios is usually depicted as a handsome young man crowned with the shining aureole of the Sun who drove the chariot of the Sun across the sky each day to Earth-circling Oceanus and through the  returned to the East at night. According to Augustan poet Ovid, he dressed in tyrian purple robes and sat on a throne of bright emeralds. In ancient artefacts (such as coins, vases, or reliefs) he is presented as a beautiful youth with wavy hair, a strong god in the bloom of youth, with a crown of rays upon his head. His solar crown traditionally had twelve rays, symbolising the twelve months of the year. He was usually represented clothed, his face somewhat full. In the Homeric Hymn to Helios, Helios is said to drive the golden chariot drawn by steeds; and Pindar speaks of Helios's "fire-darting steeds". Still later, the horses were given fire related names: Pyrois ("The Fiery One"), Aeos ("he of the dawn"), Aethon ("Blazing"), and Phlegon ("Burning"). In a Mithraic invocation, Helios's appearance is given as thus:

A god is then summoned. He is described as "a youth, fair to behold, with fiery hair, clothed in a white tunic and a scarlet cloak and wearing a fiery crown." He is named as "Helios, lord of heaven and earth, god of gods."

As mentioned above, the imagery surrounding a chariot-driving solar deity is likely Indo-European in origin and is common to both early Greek and Near Eastern religions. The earliest artistic representations of the "chariot god" come from the Parthian period (3rd century) in Persia where there is evidence of rituals being performed for the sun god by Magi, indicating an assimilation of the worship of Helios and Mithras.

Helios is seen as both a personification of the Sun and the fundamental creative power behind it and as a result is often worshiped as a god of life and creation. Homer described Helios as a god "who gives joy to mortals" and other ancient texts give him the epithet "gracious", given that he is the source of life and regeneration and associated with the creation of the world. The comic playwright Aristophanes in Nephelae describes Helios as "the horse-guider, who fills the plain of the earth with exceeding bright beams, a mighty deity among gods and mortals." One passage recorded in the Greek Magical Papyri says of Helios, "the earth flourished when you shone forth and made the plants fruitful when you laughed and brought to life the living creatures when you permitted." He is said to have helped create animals out of primeval mud.

Mythology

God of the Sun

Rising and Setting 

Helios was envisioned as a god driving his chariot from east to west each day, pulled by four white horses. In the ancient world people were not too troubled over how his chariot flew through the sky, as they did not envision the Earth as a spherical object, so Helios would not be travelling around a globe in an orbit; rather he crossed the sky from east to west each morning in a linear direction. The chariot and his horses are mentioned by neither Homer nor Hesiod, the earliest work in which they are attested being the Homeric Hymn to Helios. Although the chariot is usually said to be the work of Hephaestus, Hyginus states that it was Helios himself who built it. In one Greek vase painting, Helios appears riding across the sea in the cup of the Delphic tripod which appears to be a solar reference. His chariot is described as golden or pink in colour. The Horae, goddesses of the seasons, are part of his retinue and help him yoke his chariot. His sister Eos is said to have not only opened the gates for Helios, but would often accompany him as well in his daily swing across the skies. Every day he rose from the Ocean, the great earth-encircling river, carried by his horses:

In Homer, he is said to go under the earth at sunset, but it is not clear whether that means he travels through Tartarus. Athenaeus in his Deipnosophistae relates that, at the hour of sunset, Helios climbs into a great cup of solid gold in which he passes from the Hesperides in the farthest west to the land of the Ethiops, with whom he passes the dark hours. According to Athenaeus, Mimnermus said that in the night Helios travels eastwards with the use of a bed (also created by Hephaestus) in which he sleeps, rather than a cup, and writes that "Helios gained a portion of toil for all his days", as there is no rest for either him or his horses. Just like his chariot and horses, the cup is attested in neither Hesiod nor Homer, first appearing in the Titanomachy, an 8th-century BC epic poem attributed to Eumelus of Corinth. Tragedian Aeschylus in his lost play Prometheus Unbound (a sequel to Prometheus Bound) describes the sunset as such:

In the extreme east and west lived people who tended to his horses in their stalls, people for whom summer and heat were perpetual and ripeful. The sun god is described as being "tireless in his journeys" as he repeats the same process day after day for an eternity. Palladas sarcastically wrote that "The Sun to men is the god of light, but if he too were insolent to them in his shining, they would not desire even light."

Disrupted schedule 

On several instances in mythology the normal solar schedule is disrupted; he was ordered not to rise for three days during the conception of Heracles, and made the winter days longer in order to look upon Leucothoe, Athena's birth was a sight so impressive that Helios halted his steeds and stayed still in the sky for a long while, as heaven and earth both trembling at the newborn goddess' sight. In the Iliad Hera who supports the Greeks, makes him set earlier than usual against his will during battle, and later still during the same war, after his sister Eos's son Memnon was killed, she made him downcast, causing his light to fade, so she could be able to freely steal her son's body undetected by the armies, as he consoled his sister in her grief over Memnon's death. It was said that summer days are longer due to Helios often stopping his chariot mid-air to watch from above nymphs dancing during the summer, and sometimes he is late to rise because he lingers with his consort. If the other gods wish so, Helios can be hastened on his daily course when they wish it to be night.

When Zeus desired to sleep with Alcmene, he made one night last threefold, hiding the light of the Sun, by ordering Helios not to rise for those three days. Satirical author Lucian of Samosata dramatized this myth in one of his Dialogues of the Gods, where the messenger of the gods Hermes goes to Helios on Zeus' orders to tell him not to rise for three days so Zeus can spend much time with Alcmene and sire Heracles. Although Helios reluctantly agrees and wishes best luck, he complains about this decision of the king of gods, finding the reason too weak for humanity to be deprived of sunlight and stay in the dark for so long, and negatively compares Zeus to his father, claiming Cronus never abandoned his marital bed and Rhea for the love of some mortal woman.{{efn|Helios (and Lucian) is wrong here; Cronus had Chiron by Philyra.<ref>Pseudo-Apollodorus, Bibliotheca 1.2.4</ref>}} From the union of Zeus and Alcmene, Heracles was born.

While Heracles was travelling to Erytheia to retrieve the cattle of Geryon for his tenth labour, he crossed the Libyan desert and was so frustrated at the heat that he shot an arrow at Helios, the Sun. Almost immediately, Heracles realized his mistake and apologized profusely (Pherecydes wrote that Heracles stretched his arrow at him menacingly, but Helios ordered him to stop, and Heracles in fear desisted); In turn and equally courteous, Helios granted Heracles the golden cup which he used to sail across the sea every night, from the west to the east because he found Heracles' actions immensely bold. In the versions delivered by Apollodorus and Pherecydes, Heracles was only about to shoot Helios, but according to Panyassis, he did shoot and wounded the god. Heracles used this golden cup to reach Erytheia, and after he had taken Geryon's cattle, returned it back to its owner.Noted in Kerenyi 1951:191, note 595. A late sixth century or early fifth century BC lekythos depicts Heracles offering a sacrifice on one side, and Helios rising on the other, suggesting that Heracles is sacrificing to the god seeking help from him in order to reach the three-bodied Geryon. On the vase, Helios is rising in his chariot between Eos and Nyx (the Night), represented as swirls of mist, while Heracles is roasting the sacrificial meat next to a lurking dog, identified as Cerberus, guiding the entrance to the Underworld; from this one can infer that the vase depicts the place in the Ocean where the earth, the sky and the sea meet, as the light of Helios is juxtaposed with the darkness of the Underworld, separated by a barrier of mist.

When the brothers Thyestes and Atreus fought over which would get to rule Mycenae, following the death of the previous king, Eurystheus, Atreus suggested that whoever possessed of a splendid golden ram would be declared king. Unbeknownst to Atreus, his unfaithful wife Aerope had given Thyestes the ram, and thus Thyestes became king. Zeus sent Hermes to Atreus, telling Atreus to get Thyestes to agree that should the Sun rise in the west and set in the east, the kingship would be given to Atreus. Thyestes agreed, and Helios indeed rose where he usually set, and set where he usually rose, not standing the unfairness of Thyestes' actions. The Mycenaeans then bowed to the man who had accomplished such an achievement and reversed the course of the Sun. According to Plato, Helios at first used to rise in the west and set in the east, and only changed that after the incident of the golden ram, as did the other celestial bodies which followed suit.

 Solar eclipses 

Solar eclipses were phaenomena of fear as well as wonder in Ancient Greece, and were seen as the Sun abandoning humanity. According to a fragment of Archilochus, it is Zeus who blocks Helios and makes him disappear from the sky; "Zeus the Olympian veiled the light to make it night at midday even as sun was shining: so dread fear has overtaken men" he writes and in one of his paeans, the lyric poet Pindar describes a solar eclipse as the Sun's light being hidden from the world, a bad omen of destruction and doom:

Plutarch in his Moralia writes that it is "through love of the sun that the moon herself makes her circuit, and has her meetings with him to receive from him all fertility". Aristophanes describes a solar eclipse in his play Nephelae that was observed in Athens in 425 BC.

 Horses of Helios 

Some lists, cited by Hyginus, of the names of horses that pulled Helios' chariot, are as follows. Scholarship acknowledges that, despite differences between the lists, the names of the horses always seem to refer to fire, flame, light and other luminous qualities.
 According to Eumelus of Corinth – late 7th/ early 6th century BC:  The male trace horses are Eous (by him the sky is turned) and Aethiops (as if flaming, parches the grain) and the female yoke-bearers are Bronte ("Thunder") and Sterope ("Lightning").
 According to Ovid — Roman, 1st century BC Phaethon's ride: Pyrois ("the fiery one"), Eous ("he of the dawn"), Aethon ("blazing"), and Phlegon ("burning").Dain, Philippe. Mythographe du Vatican III. Traduction et commentaire. Besançon: Institut des Sciences et Techniques de l'Antiquité, 2005. p. 156 (footnote nr. 33) (Collection "ISTA", 854). DOI: https://doi.org/10.3406/ista.2005.2854; www.persee.fr/doc/ista_0000-0000_2005_edc_854_1

Hyginus writes that according to Homer, the horses' names are Abraxas and Therbeeo; but Homer makes no mention of horses or chariot.

Alexander of Aetolia, cited in Athenaeus, related that the magical herb grew on the island Thrinacia, which was sacred to Helios, and served as a remedy against fatigue for the sun god's horses. Aeschrion of Samos informed that it was known as the "dog's-tooth" and was believed to have been sown by Cronus.

 Awarding of Rhodes 

According to Pindar, when the gods divided the earth among them, Helios was absent, and thus he got no lot of land. He complained to Zeus about it, who offered to do the division of portions again, but Helios refused the offer, for he had seen a new land emerging from the deep of the sea; a rich, productive land for humans and good for cattle too. Helios asked for this island to be given to him, and Zeus agreed to it, with Lachesis (one of the three Fates) raising her hands to confirm the oath. Alternatively in another tradition, it was Helios himself who made the island rise from the sea when he caused the water which had overflowed it to disappear. He named it Rhodes, after his lover Rhode (the daughter of Poseidon and Aphrodite or Amphitrite), and it became the god's sacred island, where he was honoured above all other gods. With Rhode Helios sired seven sons, known as the Heliadae ("sons of the Sun"), who became the first rulers of the island, as well as one daughter, Electryone. Three of their grandsons founded the cities Ialysos, Camiros and Lindos on the island, named after themselves; thus Rhodes came to belong to him and his line, with the autochthonous peoples of Rhodes claiming descend from the Heliadae.

Once Athena was born from Zeus' head, Helios enjoined his children and the rest of the Rhodians to immediately build an altar for the goddess quickly, in order to win her favour (and apparently he disclosed the same to the Atticans too); they did as he told them, however they forgot to bring fire with them to properly do the sacrifice. Zeus, however, sent a golden cloud and rained gold on them, and Athena still graced them with unmatched skill in every art. For this reason, Athena was worshipped in Rhodes with flameless sacrifices; the victim would be slain on the altar of burn offering, but the fire was not set on the altar.

 Phaethon 

The most well known story about Helios is the one involving his son Phaethon, who asked him to drive his chariot for a single day. Although all versions agree that Phaethon convinced Helios to give him his chariot, and that he failed in his task with disastrous results, there is a great number of details that vary by version, including the identity of Phaethon's mother, the location the story takes place, the role Phaethon's sisters the Heliades play, the motivation behind Phaethon's decision to ask his father for such thing, and even the exact relation between god and mortal.

Traditionally Phaethon was Helios' son by the Oceanid nymph Clymene, or alternatively Rhode or the otherwise unknown Prote. In one version of the story, Phaethon is Helios' grandson, rather than son, through the boy's father Clymenus. In this version, Phaethon's mother is an Oceanid nymph named Merope.

In Euripides' lost play Phaethon, surviving only in twelve fragments, Phaethon is the product of an illicit liaison between his mother Clymene (who is now married to Merops, the king of Aethiopia) and Helios, though she claimed that her lawful husband was the father of her all her children.Diggle, pp 7–8 Clymene reveals the truth to her son, and urges him to travel east to get confirmation from his father after she informs him that Helios promised to grant their child any wish when he slept with her. Although reluctant at first, Phaethon is convinced and sets on to find his birth father. In a surviving fragment from the play, Helios accompanies his son in his ill-fated journey in the skies, trying to give him instructions on how to drive the chariot while he rides on a spare horse named Sirius, as someone, perhaps a paedagogus informs Clymene of Phaethon's fate, who is probably accompanied by slave women:

If this messenger did witness the flight himself, it is possible there was also a passage where he described Helios taking control over the bolting horses in the same manner as Lucretius described. Phaethon inevitably dies; a fragment near the end of the play has Clymene order the slave girls hide Phaethon's still-smouldering body from Merops, and laments Helios' role in her son's death, saying he destroyed him and her both. Near the end of the play it seems that Merops, having found out about Clymene's affair and Phaethon's true parentage, tries to kill her; her eventual fate is unclear, but it has been suggested she is saved by some deus ex machina. A number of deities have been proposed for the identity of this possible deus ex machina, with Helios among them.

In Ovid's account, Zeus' son Epaphus mocks Phaethon's claim that he is the son of the sun god; his mother Clymene tells Phaethon to go to Helios himself, to ask for confirmation of his paternity, and the boy travels east to meet his father. Helios, living in a palace far away and attended by several other gods, warmly receives his son, and promises him on the river Styx any gift that he might ask as a proof of paternity; Phaethon asks for the privilege to drive Helios' chariot for a single day, causing his father to immediately regret his gift. Although Helios warns his son of how dangerous and disastrous this would be, and keeps begging Phaethon to rethink his wish, he is nevertheless unable to change Phaethon's mind or revoke his promise. Phaethon takes the reins in his father's horror, and drives the chariot with catastrophic results; the earth burns when he travels too low, and freezes when he takes the chariot too high. Zeus, in order to save the world, strikes Phaethon with a lightning, killing him. Helios, in his sorrow and deprived of all light out of grief, refuses to resume his job, but he returns to his task and duty at the appeal of the other gods, as well as Zeus' threats. He then takes his anger out on his four horses, whipping them in fury for causing his son's death.

Nonnus of Panopolis presented a slightly different version of the myth, narrated by Hermes; according to him, Helios met and fell in love with Clymene, the daughter of the Ocean, and the two soon got married with her father's blessing; Merops does not factor at all, and their son Phaethon is born within marriage. When he grows up, fascinated with his father's job, he asks him to drive his chariot for a single day. Helios does his best to dissuade him, arguing that sons are not necessarily fit to step into their fathers' shoes, bringing up as example that none of Zeus' sons wields lightning bolts like he does. But under pressure of Phaethon and Clymene's begging both, he eventually gives in, and gives his son the reins and instructions for the road. As per all other versions of the myth, Phaethon's ride is catastrophic and ends in his death.

Hyginus wrote that Phaethon secretly mounted his father's car without said father's knowledge and leave, but with the aid of his sisters the Heliades who yoked the horses, implying the existence of an early version, where Phaethon and his (full) sisters are legitimate offspring of the sun god and his wife, brought up in their father's house, rather than product(s) of an extramarital liaison.

At any point, Helios recovered the reins in time, thus saving the earth and keeping it from burning to a cinder due to the flames from the chariot. Another consistent detail across versions are that Phaethon's sisters the Heliades mourn him by the Eridanus and are turned into black poplar trees, who shed tears of amber. According to Quintus Smyrnaeus, it was Helios who turned them into trees, for their honour to Phaethon. The part concerning the Heliades might have been a mythical device to account for the origin of amber; it is probably of no coincidence that the Greek word for amber, elektron, resembles elektor, an epithet of Helios. The poplar tree was considered sacred to Helios, due to the sun-like brilliance its shining leaves have. A sacred poplar in an epigram written by Antipater of Thessalonica warns the reader not to harm her because Helios cares for her. In one version of the myth, Helios conveyed his dead son to the stars, as a constellation (the Auriga).

The aftermath of this episode was satirized by Lucian; in one of his dialogues, Zeus angrily berates Helios for lenting his chariot to his inexperienced son, who burned the earth with it as Helios makes excuses for himself and his child; Zeus returns the damaged chariot to its owner and threatens Helios to zap him with one of his lightning bolts should he ever do such thing again.

Relating to this is a fable from Aesop, in which Helios announces his intention to get married, causing the frogs to protest intensively. When Zeus, disturbed by all that noise, asks them to explain their stance, they reply that the Sun already burns their ponds on his own just fine; if he gets married and begets even more sons, it will sure doom them.

 The Watchman 
 Persephone 

Helios saw and stood witness to everything that happened underneath him where his light shone. When Hades abducted Persephone, Helios, who was characterized with the epithet Helios Panoptes ("the all-seeing Sun"), was the only one to witness it, while Hecate only heard Persephone's screams as she was snatched away. Persephone's mother Demeter, looked far and wide in search of her daughter, and at the suggestion of Hecate, came to him, and asked him to respect her as a goddess and tell her if he had seen anything. Helios, sympathizing with her grief, told her in detail that it was Hades who, with Zeus' permission, had taken an unwilling and screaming Persephone to the Underworld to be his wife and queen, and that Zeus had not only permitted the marriage but also consented to the abduction.

In the Homeric Hymn to Demeter he asks Demeter to sooth her pain, as Hades is not an unworthy son-in-law or bridegroom for her, being her own brother and king of the Underworld besides, living with those he was chosen by lot to rule over, before he yokes his winged horses and chariot and ascends in the sky as the day breaks. In Ovid's Fasti, Demeter asks the stars first about Persephone's whereabouts, and it is Helice (the constellation Ursa Major) who advises her to go ask Helios, for the night knew nothing of those events. Demeter is not slow to approach him, and Helios then tells her not to waste time, and seek out for "the queen of the third world", the bride of Zeus's brother.

Helios and Hecate informing Demeter of Persephone's abduction seems to be based on a common theme found in many parts of the world where the Sun and the Moon are questioned concerning events that happen below based on their perceived ability to bear witness to everything that take place on earth, and is one of the earliest examples of Hecate's connection to the moon and Helios.Athanassakis and Wolkow, p. 90

 Ares and Aphrodite 

In another myth, Aphrodite was married to Hephaestus, but she cheated on him with his brother Ares, god of war. In Book Eight of the Odyssey, the blind singer Demodocus describes how the illicit lovers committed adultery, until one day Helios caught them in the act, and immediately informed Aphrodite's husband Hephaestus. Upon learning that, Hephaestus forged a net so thin it could hardly be seen, in order to ensnare them. He then announced that he was leaving for Lemnos. Upon hearing that, Ares went to Aphrodite and the two lovers coupled. Once again Helios informed Hephaestus, who came into the room and trapped them in the net. He then called the other gods to witness the humiliating sight.

Much later versions add a young man to the story, a warrior named Alectryon, tasked by Ares to stand guard should anyone approach. But Alectryon fell asleep, allowing Helios to discover the two lovers and inform Hephaestus. In his anger, Ares turned Alectryon into a rooster, a bird that to this day crows at dawn, to announce the arrival of the Sun.Ausonius, 26.2.27 According to Pausanias, the rooster is Helios' sacred animal, always crowing when he is about to rise. For this, Aphrodite hated Helios and his race for all time. In some versions, she cursed his daughter Pasiphaë to fall in love with the Cretan Bull as revenge against him.Libanius, Progymnasmata 2.21 Pasiphaë's daughter Phaedra's passion for her step-son Hippolytus was also said to have been inflicted on her by Aphrodite for this same reason.

 Leucothoe and Clytie 

For Helios' tale-telling, Aphrodite would have her revenge on him. She made him fall for a mortal princess named Leucothoe, forgetting his previous lover the Oceanid nymph Clytie for her sake. "And he that betrayed her stolen love was equally betrayed by love. What now avail, O son of Hyperion, thy beauty and brightness and radiant beams? For thou, who dost inflame all lands with thy fires, art thyself inflamed by a strange fire. Thou who shouldst behold all things, dost gaze on Leucothoe alone, and on one maiden dost thou fix those eyes which belong to the whole world. Anon too early dost thou rise in the eastern sky, and anon too late dost thou sink beneath the waves, and through thy long lingering over her dost prolong the short wintry hours. Sometimes thy beams fail utterly, thy heart's darkness passing to thy rays, and darkened thou dost terrify the hearts of men. Nor is it that the moon has come 'twixt thee and earth that thou art dark; 'tis that love of thine alone that makes thy face so wan. Thou delightest in her alone.", writes Ovid. Helios would watch her from above, even making the winter days longer so he could have more time looking at her. Taking the form of her mother Eurynome, Helios entered their palace with no problem and came into the girl's room where he dismissed her servants so he would be left alone with her, using the excuse of wanting to entrust a secret to his "daughter". There he took his real form, revealing himself to the girl.

However, Clytie, still in love with him, informed Leucothoe's father Orchamus of this affair, and he buried Leucothoe alive in the earth. Helios came too late to rescue her, his grief over her death compared to the one he had over Phaethon's fiery end, and could not revive her, so instead he poured nectar into the earth, and turned the dead Leucothoe into a frankincense tree, so that she could still breathe air (after a fashion) instead of rotting beneath the soil. Clytie had hoped that this would get Helios back to her, but he wanted nothing to do with her, angered as he was about the role she played in his love's death, and went on his way. Clytie stripped herself naked, accepting no food or drink, and sat on a rock for nine days, pining after him; he never looked back at her. Eventually she turned into a purple, sun-gazing flower, the heliotrope, which follows Helios' movement in the sky, still in love with him; her form much changed, her love unchanged.Hard, p. 45; Gantz, p. 34; Berens, p. 63; Grimal, s. v. Clytia Edith Hamilton notes that this case is unique in Greek mythology, as rather than the usual, a god being in love with an unwilling maiden, it is instead the maiden who is in love with an unwilling god. This myth, it has been theorized, might have been used to explain the use of frankincense aromatic resin in Helios' worship, similar to the story of Daphne for the use of laurel. Leucothoe being buried alive as punishment by a male guardian, which is not too unlike Antigone's own fate, may also indicate an ancient tradition involving human sacrifice in a vegetation cult. At first the stories of Leucothoe and Clytie might had been two distinct myths concerning Helios that were later combined along with a third story, that of Helios discovering Ares and Aphrodite's affair and then informing Hephaestus, into a single tale either by Ovid himself or his source.

Clytie's herb has been identified with the purple heliotropium, however people from the Middle Ages onwards have supplanted it with the yellow sunflower in retellings, commentaries and artwork, even though in the story Ovid describes it as purple, or "like a violet". Moreover, sunflowers are native to North America, not Greece or Italy, so it is unlikely ancient writers would have been familiar with it.

 Other 
In Sophocles' play Ajax, Ajax the Great, minutes before committing suicide, calls upon Helios to stop his golden reins when he reaches Ajax' native land of Salamis and inform his aging father Telamon and his mother of their son's fate and death, and salutes him one last time before he kills himself.

 Involvement in wars 

 The Titanomachy 
Helios sided with the other gods in several battles; during what appears to have been the Titanomachy, Zeus sacrificed a bull to him, Gaia, and Uranus, and in accordance they revealed to him the will of the gods in the affair, the omens indicating the victory of the gods and a defection to them of the enemy. Surviving fragments from the lost poem Titanomachy, traditionally attributed to Eumelus of Corinth (8th century BC), imply scenes where Helios is the only one among the Titans to have abstained from attacking the Olympian gods, and they, after the war was over, in recognition of the help he offered, gave him a place in the sky and awarded him with a chariot, drawn by two male and two female horses, to drive during the day and a vessel in which he would sail the ocean at night.

 The Gigantomachy 
He also took part in the Giant wars; it was said by Pseudo-Apollodorus that during the battle of the Giants against the gods, the giant Alcyoneus stole Helios' cattle from Erytheia where the god kept them, or alternatively, that it was Alcyoneus' very theft of the cattle that started the war.Gantz, pp. 419, 448–449 Because the earth goddess Gaia, mother and ally of the Giants, learned of the prophecy that the giants would perish at the hand of a mortal, she sought to find a magical herb that would protect them and render them practically indestructible; thus Zeus ordered Helios, as well as his sisters Selene (Moon) and Eos (Dawn) not to shine, and harvested all of the plant for himself, denying Gaia the opportunity to make the Giants immortal, while Athena summoned the mortal Heracles to fight by their side.

At some point during the battle of gods and giants in Phlegra, where the battle took place, Helios took up an exhausted from the fight Hephaestus on his chariot (in gratitude, Hephaestus forged four ever-flowing fountains and fire-breathing bulls for Helios' son Aeëtes). After the war was won and over, one of the giants, Picolous, fled the battle against Zeus; he went to Aeaea, the island where Helios' daughter, the sorceress Circe, lived. He attempted to chase Circe away from the island, only to be killed by Helios, who defended his daughter.The Argonautica of Apollonius Rhodius: Book III, p. 89 note 845 From the blood of the slain giant that dripped on the earth a new plant was sprang, the herb moly, named thus from the battle ("malos" in Ancient Greek):

The plant "moly" of which Homer speaks; this plant had, it is said, grown from the blood of the giant killed in the isle of Circe; it has a white flower; the ally of Circe who killed the giant was Helios; the combat was hard (mâlos) from which the name of this plant.Chrystal, p. 101

The flower had a black root, for the colour of the blood of the slain Giant, and a white flower, either for the white Sun that killed him, or for the fact that Circe grew pale of terror. This is the very same plant, a plant only immortals can uproot from the ground, that Odysseus would later use on Hermes' suggestion to save his companions from Circe's magic, after she transformed them all into swines. Helios is depicted in the Pergamon Altar, waging war against Giants next to his sisters Eos and Selene and his mother Theia in the southern frieze.LIMC 617 (Helios). He is riding his four-horse chariot against a Giant, while another lays dead under the hooves of his steeds, wearing a long chiton, holding a torch on his right hand and the reins in his left. His participation in the Gigantomachy (wearing a cuirass) is also depicted on a fragmentary vase by the Pronomos Painter, and perhaps in an attic column krater. Additionally, a rein guide for a chariot depicts Helios and a goddess with a crescent and veil over her head, thought to be Selene, standing on a gate tower and repelling the attacks of snake-legged Giants.

 Clashes and punishments 
 Gods 
Despite that, he sometimes clashed with other gods; just like the Athenians had a story about how Athena and Poseidon fought over the patronage of the city of Athens, the Corinthians had a similar story about Corinth. Helios and Poseidon, representing fire versus water, clashed as to who would get to have the city. The Hecatoncheir Briareos, an elder god, was tasked to settle the dispute between the two gods; he awarded the Acrocorinth to Helios, while Poseidon was given the isthmus of Corinth.Dio Chrysostom, Discourses 37.11–12

Aelian wrote that Nerites was the son of the sea god Nereus and the Oceanid Doris. In the version where Nerites became the lover of Poseidon, it is said that Helios turned him into a shellfish, for reasons unknown to Aelian's sources, who theorized that perhaps Helios was somehow offended. At first Aelian writes that Helios was resentful of the boy's speed, but when trying to explain why he changed his form, he suggests that perhaps Poseidon and Helios were rivals in love, and the sun god wished the youth would run among the constellations, rather than be with the sea monsters.

In an Aesop fable, Helios and the north wind god Boreas argued about which one between them was the strongest god. They agreed that whoever was able to make a passing traveller remove his cloak would be declared the winner. Boreas was the one to try his luck first; but no matter how hard he blew, he could not remove the man's cloak, instead making him wrap his cloak around him even tighter. Helios shone bright then, and the traveller, overcome with the heat, removed his cloak, giving him the victory. The moral is that persuasion is better than force. Athenaeus of Naucratis records in his Deipnosophistae that Greek author Hieronymus of Rhodes, in his Historical Notes, quoted an anecdote about playwrights Sophocles and Euripides that referenced the fable of the two gods' contest; it related how Sophocles made love to a boy outside the city's gates who then proceeded to steal Sophocles' cloak, and leave behind his own boyish one. Euripides then joked that he had had that same boy too, and it had not cost him anything. Sophocles then replied to him that "It was the Sun, and not a boy, whose heat stripped me naked; as for you, Euripides, when you were kissing someone else's wife the North Wind screwed you. You are unwise, you who sow in another's field, to accuse Eros of being a snatch-thief."

 Mortals 

Relating to his nature as the Sun, as well as his parentage, as the son of Theia, the goddess of sight (ancient Greeks believed that eyes emitted light allowing humans to see), Helios was presented as a god who could restore and also deprive of people's light as it was regarded that his light that made the faculty of sight and enabled visible things to be seen. According to Pindar, the solar eye was the "forefather" of all mortal eyes, and mortals owed both sight and blindness to Helios. After Orion was blinded by King Oenopion for attacking his daughter Merope, he was given a guide, Cedalion, from the god Hephaestus to guide him. Orion with Cedalion on his shoulders travelled to the east, where he met Helios. Helios then healed Orion's eyes, restoring his eyesight.

Meanwhile, in Phineus's story, his blinding, as reported in Apollonius Rhodius's Argonautica, was Zeus' punishment for Phineus revealing the future to mankind. For this reason he was also tormented by the Harpies, who stole or defiled whatever food he had at hand. According, however, to one of the alternative versions, it was Helios who had deprived Phineus of his sight; Phineus, when asked by Zeus if he preferred to die or lose sight as punishment for having his sons killed by their stepmother, Phineus chose the latter, saying he would rather never see the Sun than die, and consequently the offended Helios blinded him and sent the Harpies against him. Pseudo-Oppian wrote that Helios' wrath was due to some obscure victory of the prophet; after Calais and Zetes slew the Harpies tormenting Phineus, Helios then turned him into a mole, a blind creature. In yet another version, he blinded Phineus at the request of his son Aeëtes, who asked him to do so because Phineus had offered his assistance to Aeëtes' enemies.

In another tale, in order to escape from Crete and its king Minos, the Athenian inventor Daedalus and his young son Icarus fashioned themselves wings made of birds' feathers glued together with wax and flew away. According to scholia on Euripides, Icarus, being young and rashful, thought himself greater than Helios, forgetting his wings were only held together by wax. Angered, Helios hurled his blazing rays at him, melting the wax and plunging Icarus into the sea to drown. Later, it was Helios who decreed that said sea would be named after the unfortunate youth, the Icarian Sea.

Arge was a huntress who, while hunting down a particularly fast stag, claimed that fast as the Sun as it was, she would eventually catch up to it. Helios, offended by the girl's words, changed her shape into that of a doe.Alexander Stuart Murray and William H. Klapp, Handbook of World Mythology, p. 288

In one rare version of Smyrna's tale, it was an angry Helios who cursed her to fall in love with her own father Cinyras because of some unspecified offence the girl committed against him; in the vast majority of other versions however, the culprit behind Smyrna's curse is the goddess of love Aphrodite.

 Oxen of the Sun 

In his sacred island of Thrinacia, Helios kept his sacred flocks and herds of sheep and cattle. He owned seven herds of cows and many sheep as well; each flock numbered fifty beasts in it, totaling 350 cows and 350 sheep—the number of days of the year in the early Ancient Greek calendar; the seven herds correspond to the week, containing seven days. The cows did not breed (thus not increasing in number) or die (thus not decreasing in number). In the Homeric Hymn 4 to Hermes, after Hermes has been brought before Zeus by an angry Apollo for stealing Apollo's sacred cows, the young god excuses himself for his actions and says to his father that "I reverence Helios greatly and the other gods", not unaware of Helios' special connection to cows. Augeas, who in some versions is his son, safe-kept a herd of twelve bulls sacred to the god. Moreover, it was said that Augeas' enormous herd of cattle, as he owned more beasts than any other rich man or king could ever acquire in life, was a gift to him by his father; he made him the greatest master of flocks, and all he cattle to thrive and prosper unceasingly, with no end. Another place of their dwelling was named Erytheia, from where the Giant Alcyoneus stole them during the Gigantomachy, and it is mentioned he kept a herd of thick-fleeced sheep at Taenarum, which was also a well known entrance to the Underworld, located on the tip of the Mani peninsula, between the gulfs of Messenia and Laconia.

Apollonia in Illyria was another place where he kept a flock of his sheep; a man named Peithenius had been put in charge of them, but the sheep were devoured by wolves. The other Apolloniates, thinking he had been neglectful, gouged out Peithenius' eyes. Angered over the man's treatment, Helios made the earth grow barren and ceased to bear fruit; the earth grew fruitful again only after the Apolloniates had propitiated Peithenius by craft, and by two suburbs and a house he picked out, pleasing the god. This story, more or less the same, albeit in a more detailed manner, is also attested by Greek historian Herodotus, who calls the man Evenius and records the story as a real historical event of the recent past, and not a mythological tale, but the anecdote attests to the divine introduction of prophecy, rather than a real biographical event. Herodotus adds that Evenius meant to buy new sheep to replace the ones he had lost, but was discovered, that the Apolloniates consulted the Oracle of Delphi, and were told that the god was angry at them because it was divine will for the sheep to be devoured. The Apolloniates asked Evenius what he wished in form of reparations, without mentioning the oracle, so Evenius asked for a moderate compensation.

 Odyssey 

During Odysseus' journey to get back home, he arrived at the island of Circe, who warned him not to touch Helios' sacred cows once he reached Thrinacia, the sun god's sacred island, where the cattle was kept, or the god would keep them from returning home:

Though Odysseus warns his men, when supplies run short they impiously kill and eat some of the cattle of the Sun. The guardians of the island, Helios' daughters Phaethusa and Lampetia, tell their father about this. Helios then appeals to Zeus telling him to dispose of Odysseus' men, or he will go in the Underworld and shine among the dead instead, rejecting the crewmen's compensation of a new temple in Ithaca, and preferring a death-for-death one. Zeus promises Helios that he will deal with it, and destroys the ship with his lightning bolt, killing all the men except for Odysseus.Pseudo-Apollodorus, Epitome 7.22

This episode is symbolic; the cattle of the Sun are attended to by his daughters "Bright" and "Shining", born to him by "Younger", all epithets related to the Sun. By convention, Hades is the place where Helios with his light cannot reach; dying meant no longer seeing the sunlight, as being alive was to live under it, so Helios' descent to the Underworld would destabilize the balance between the dead and the living. Relating to the number of cows found on the Sun's island, Eustathius wrote that each cow stood for a day in the year, thus the companions devouring the oxen of the Sun symbolizing them wasting ("eating up") their own days and life. H. J. Rose disagreed with the interpretation, writing that 350 is a sacred Oriental number that reached Greece and had nothing to do with the Sun.
Aristotle, who also connected the number of cattle to the number to days, suggested that the reason Helios did not see the companions stealing his cattle could be explained a number of ways, such as he sees everything but not at once, or that Lampetia being the messenger is symbolic for light being messenger of sight, or that her account is similar to oath-swearing on his name.

Although the proem of the Odyssey names Helios as the primary agent of retribution for the sacrilege, having "taken away the day of return" of the comrades, his role is actually limited; he resorts to threaten Zeus, and it is he who destroys the ship and the men (although in other myths, Helios is perfectly capable of exacting revenge on his own, without a middleman); by all means, Zeus should be considered the one responsible, and the attribution of their demise solely to Helios even seems biased. However it could be due to that Zeus is not the one acting out of personal animosity (Helios is), rather he is asked and inclined to serve justice.

 Other works 

Helios is featured in several of Lucian's works beyond his Dialogues of the Gods. In another work of Lucian's, Icaromenippus, Selene the Moon complains to the titular character about philosophers wanting to stir up strife and sour feelings between her and her brother with their theories about them—namely, that the moon steals her spurious light from the sun (compare the Phocylidea, where it is stated that she is not envious that his rays are much stronger than her own), or calling the sun a red-hot lump. Later he is seen feasting with the other gods on Olympus, and prompting Menippus to wonder how can night fall on the Heavens while he is there. In A True Story, the Sun is an inhabited place, ruled by a king named Phaethon, referencing Helios's mythological son. The inhabitants of the Sun are at war with those of the Moon, ruled by King Endymion (Selene's lover), over colonization of the Morning Star (Aphrodite's planet).

Diodorus Siculus recorded an unorthodox version of the myth, in which Basileia, who had succeeded her father Uranus to his royal thrown, married her brother  Hyperion, and had two children, a son Helios and a daughter Selene, both admired for their beauty and their chastity. Because Basileia's other brothers envied these offspring, and feared that Hyperion would try to seize power for himself, conspired against him; they put Hyperion to the sword and drowned Helios in the river Eridanus, while Selene took her own life. After the massacre, Helios appeared in a dream to his grieving mother and assured her and their murderers would be punished, and that he and his sister would now be transformed into immortal, divine natures; what was known as Mene would now be called Selene, and the "holy fire" in the heavens would bear his own name.Caldwell, p. 41, note on lines 207–210

It was said that due to her burning passion for the mortal Endymion, his sister Selene would often abandon the night sky to be with him; during those nights that she was too preoccupied, she would give her moon chariot to Helios to drive it; although unfamiliar at first, in time he learnt to drive it like his own.

Claudian wrote that in his infancy, Helios (along with Selene–their sister Eos is not mentioned with them) was nursed by his aunt the water goddess Tethys, back in the old days when his light was not as strong and his rays had not grown yet.

Pausanias writes that the people of Titane in Sicyon held that Titan was a brother of Helios, the first inhabitant of Titane after whom the town was named; Titan however was generally identified as Helios himself, instead of being a separate figure. Pausanias rationalizes this by suggesting that Titan was probably just a man who observed the seasons of the year when the sun ripens seeds and fruits, and was said to be Helios's brother (who otherwise is characterized as an only son) for this reason.

In Sophocles's play Oedipus at Colonus, Oedipus curses Creon, wishing that of all the gods may Helios, witnessing all that has happened, grant him an old age as wretched as his own.

In Imagines by Philostratus, Palaestra asks him to help her with her tanning, to redden her skin with his heat.

According to sixth century BC lyric poet Stesichorus, with Helios in his palace lives his mother Theia.

In the myth of the dragon Python's slaying by Apollo, the slain serpent's corpse is said to have rotten in the strength of the "shining Hyperion," as the god himself promises.

Aelian wrote that the wolf is a beloved animal to Helios; the wolf is also Apollo's sacred animal, and the god was often known as Apollo Lyceus, "wolf Apollo".

 Consorts and children 

The god Helios is the head of a large family, and the places that venerated him the most would also typically claim both mythological and genealogical descent from him; the Cretans traced the ancestry of their king Idomeneus to Helios through his daughter Pasiphaë. Though Helios had several love affairs, they were far less numerous than those of other gods, especially Zeus, since, unsurprisingly, in a warm climate it would be more likely for the rain god rather than the sun god to be seen as the fertility god.

Traditionally the Oceanid nymph Perse was seen as the sun god's wife by whom he had various children (depending on the version), most notably the witch Circe from the Odyssey, the king of Colchis Aeëtes, Minos' wife Pasiphaë, Perses who usurped his brother Aeëtes's kingdom, and in some versions the Corinthian king Aloeus. It is unclear what caused Perse and Helios, who is the source of all light in the world, to be the parents of such dark and mysterious children. Helios distributed the land between Aloeus and Aeëtes; the former received Sicyon, the latter Corinth, but Aeëtes not desiring the land, decided to make his kingdom in Colchis. Ioannes Tzetzes adds Calypso, otherwise the daughter of Atlas, to the list of children Helios had by Perse, perhaps due to the similarities of the roles and personalities she and Circe display in the Odyssey as hosts of Odysseus.

Helios brought Aeëtes to Colchis, his eventual kingdom, on his chariot; in the same ride he transferred Circe to her own abode, Aeaea. At some point Helios warned his son of a prophecy that stated he would suffer treachery from one of his own offspring (which Aeëtes took to mean his daughter Chalciope and her children by Phrixus). Helios also bestowed several gifts on his son, such as a chariot with swift steeds, a golden helmet with four plates, a giant's war armor, and robes and a necklace as a pledge of fatherhood. When his daughter Medea betrays him and flees with Jason after stealing the golden fleece, Aeëtes called upon his father and Zeus to witness their unlawful actions against him and his people.

As father of Aeëtes, Helios was also the grandfather of Medea and would play a significant role in Euripides' rendition of her fate in Corinth. When Medea offers Princess Glauce the poisoned robes and diadem, she says they were gifts to her from Helios. Later, after Medea has caused the deaths of Glauce and Glauce's father King Creon, as well as her own children by Jason, Helios helps her escape Corinth and her impious husband Jason by offering her a chariot pulled by flying dragons. Pseudo-Apollodorus seems to follow this version as well. In Seneca's rendition of the story, a frustrated Medea criticizes the inaction of her grandfather, wondering why he has not darkened the sky at sight of such wickedness, and asks from him his fiery chariot so she can burn Corinth to the ground.Boyle, p. 98 As the charioteer of the day, he is the all-seeing eye of Zeus; but as a nocturnal sojourner, he becomes associated with the occult, which is what connects him to characters like Medea as her grandfather.

However he is also stated to have married other women instead like Rhodos in the Rhodian tradition by whom he had seven sons, the Heliadae (Ochimus, Cercaphus, Macar, Actis, Tenages, Triopas, Candalus, and the girl Electryone), the first inhabitants of Rhodes, or even Clymene, the mother of Phaethon and the Heliades, though their relationship is usually a liaison in other sources. In Nonnus' account from his epic poem the Dionysiaca, Helios and the nymph Clymene met and fell in love with each other in the mythical island of Kerne and got married, with Clymene's father Oceanus' blessing. Their wedding as attended by the Horae, Naiad nymphs who danced around, the lights of the sky such as Helios' sister Selene and Eosphorus (the planet Venus), the Hesperides, Clymene's parents Oceanus and Tethys, and others. Soon Clymene fell pregnant, and their son Phaethon was born within wedlock. Her and Helios raised their child together, until the ill-fated day the boy asked his father for his chariot; Clymene too persuaded Helios to give in to Phaethon's demands. A passage from Greek anthology mentions Helios visiting Clymene in her room.

The mortal king of Elis Augeas was said to be Helios' son, but Pausanias states that his actual father was the mortal king Eleios; the people of Elis claimed he was the son of the Sun because of the similarity of their names, and because they wanted to glorify the king.

In some rare versions, Helios is the father, rather than the brother, of his sisters Selene and Eos. A scholiast on Euripides explained that Selene was said to be his daughter since she partakes of the solar light, and changes her shape based on the position of the sun.

 Anaxibia, an Indian Naiad, was lusted after by Helios according to Pseudo-Plutarch.

 Worship 
 Cult 
 Archaic and Classical Athens 

Scholarly focus on the ancient Greek cults of Helios (as well as those of his two sisters) has generally been rather slim, partially due to how scarce both literary and archaeological sources are, and of the scattered throughout the ancient Greek world and handful cults the three siblings received, Helios was undoubtedly awarded the lion's share. L.R. Farnell assumed "that sun-worship had once been prevalent and powerful among the people of the pre-Hellenic culture, but that very few of the communities of the later historic period retained it as a potent factor of the state religion". The largely Attic literary sources used by scholars present ancient Greek religion with an Athenian bias, and, according to J. Burnet, "no Athenian could be expected to worship Helios or Selene, but he might think them to be gods, since Helios was the great god of Rhodes and Selene was worshiped at Elis and elsewhere". James A. Notopoulos considered Burnet's distinction to be artificial: "To believe in the existence of the gods involves acknowledgment through worship, as Laws 87 D, E shows" (note, p. 264). Aristophanes' Peace (406–413) contrasts the worship of Helios and Selene with that of the more essentially Greek Twelve Olympians, as the representative gods of the Achaemenid Persians (See also: Hvare-khshaeta, Mah); all the evidence shows that Helios and Selene were minor gods to the Greeks.

One answer as to the reason why for that could be that the ancient Greeks envisioned their gods as very human-like, with the sun and the moon deemed too impersonal for the Greeks to relate and connect to, who would rather pray to gods like Hermes for help and protection, who could respond to concerns in a more human way; in contrast, Helios and Selene, the divine providers of heavenly light, were seen as unlikely to cease their daily routine of rising and setting in order to intervene in human affairs so they could help them. Cults  of luminaries were somewhat anomalous, though not, as in Helios's case, rare. Helios, Eos and Selene, all Proto-Indo-European deities, were side-lined by non-PIE newcomers to the pantheon. Moreover, persisting on the sidelines seems to have been their primary function, namely to be the minor gods that the more important gods were not the same as; thus they helped keeping the Greek religion "Greek".

The tension between the mainstream traditional religious veneration of Helios, which had become enriched with ethical values and poetical symbolism in Pindar, Aeschylus and Sophocles, and the Ionian proto-scientific examination of the sun, a phenomenon of the study Greeks termed meteora, clashed in the trial of Anaxagoras c. 450 BC, in which Anaxagoras asserted that the Sun was in fact a gigantic red-hot ball of metal. His trial was a forerunner of the culturally traumatic trial of Socrates for irreligion, in 399 BC.

 Hellenistic period 
Helios was not worshipped in Athens until the Hellenistic period, in post-classical times. His worship might be described as a product of the Hellenistic era, influenced perhaps by the general spread of cosmic and astral beliefs during the reign of Alexander III. A scholiast on Sophocles wrote that the Athenians did not offer wine as an offering to the Helios among other gods, making instead nephalia, or wineless, sober sacrifices;Robert E. Meagher, p. 142 Athenaeus also reported that those who sacrificed to him did not offer wine, but brought honey instead, to the altars reasoning that the god who held the cosmos in order should not succumb to drunkenness. Lysimachides in the first century BC or first century AD reported of a festival Skira:

that the skiron is a large sunshade under which the priestess of Athena, the priest of Poseidon, and the priest of Helios walk as it is carried from the acropolis to a place called Skiron.

During the Thargelia, a festival in honour of Apollo, the Athenians had cereal offerings for Helios and the Horae. They were honoured with a procession, due to their clear connections and relevance to agriculture.Harrison, p. 79; a scholiast says "At the Pyanepsia and the Thargelia the Athenians hold a feast to Helios and the Horae, and the boys carry about branches twined with wool," A recently published decree mentions offerings to "Sun, Seasons and Apollo", showing how the three of them were associated during a festival that took place during the intense heats of the summer. The procession did not neglect cereal harvest, but also introduced non-cereal as well as animal foods, all dependent for ripening on Helios and the Seasons.Gardner and Jevons, p. 294 Helios and the Horae were also apparently worshipped during another Athenian festival held in honor of Apollo, the Pyanopsia with a feast; an attested procession, independent from the one recorded at the Thargelia, might have been in their honour.

Side B of LSCG 21.B19 from the Piraeus Asclepium prescribe cake offerings to several gods, among them Helios and Mnemosyne, two gods linked to incubation through dreams, who are offered a type of honey cake called arester and a honeycomb.CGRN File 54 The cake was put on fire during the offering. A type of cake called orthostatesJulius Pollux 6.74 made of wheaten and barley flour was offered to him and the Hours.Allaire Brumfield, Cakes in the Liknon: Votives from the Sanctuary of Demeter and Kore on Acrocorinth, Hesperia: The Journal of the American School of Classical Studies at Athens Vol. 66, No. 1 (Jan. - Mar., 1997), pp. 147-172, The American School of Classical Studies at Athens. Phthois, another flat cake made with cheese, honey and wheat was also offered to him among many other gods.

In many places people kept herds of red and white cattle in his honour, and white animals of several kinds, but especially white horses, were considered to be sacred to him. Ovid writes that horses were sacrificed to him because no slow animal should be offered to the swift god.

In Plato's Republic Helios, the Sun, is the symbolic offspring of the idea of the Good.

The ancient Greeks called Sunday "day of the Sun" after him. According to Philochorus, Athenian historian and Atthidographer of the 3rd century BC, the first day of each month was sacred to Helios.

It was during the Roman period that Helios actually rose into an actual significant religious figure and was elevated in public cult.

 Rhodes 

The island of Rhodes was an important cult center for Helios, one of the only places where he was worshipped as a major deity in ancient Greece. The cult of the sun might had been brought to Rhodes by the Dorians from mainland Greece, although Farnell suggested that sun worship was pre-Greek in origin. Another theory is that his worship could have been imported to Rhodes from the Orient. One of Pindar's most notable greatest odes is an abiding memorial of the devotion of the island of Rhodes to the cult and personality of Helios, and all evidence points that he was for the Rhodians what Olympian Zeus was for Elis or Athena for the Athenians; their local myths, especially those concerning the Heliadae, suggest that Helios in Rhodes was revered as the founder of their race and their civilization, as a great personal god, anthropomorphically imagined.

The worship of Helios at Rhodes included a ritual in which a quadriga, or chariot drawn by four horses, was driven over a precipice into the sea, in reenactment to the myth of Phaethon. Athenaeus also mentions that the Rhodians celebrated a festival, the Halieia, in his honour. Annual gymnastic tournaments were held in Helios' honor, and his festival that took place in summer included chariot-racing and contests of music and gymnastics; according to Festus (s. v. October Equus) during the Halia each year the Rhodians would also throw quadrigas dedicated to him into the sea.Farnell, p. 20, vol. IV A team of four horses was also sacrificed to him by throwing it into the sea; horse sacrifice was offered to him in many places, but only in Rhodes in teams of four; a team of four horses was also sacrificed to Poseidon in Illyricum, and the sea god was also worshipped in Lindos under the epithet Hippios denoting perhaps a blending of the cults. It was believed that if one sacrificed to the rising Sun with their day's work ahead of them, it would be proper to offer a fresh, bright white horse. This festival was celebrated yearly, in the month of September, and great athletes from abroad considered it worthwhile to compete; during the glorious days of the island, neighbouring independent states and the kings of Pergamos would send envoys to the festival, which was still flourishing many centuries later. The Colossus of Rhodes was dedicated to him. In Xenophon of Ephesus' work of fiction, Ephesian Tale of Anthia and Habrocomes, the protagonist Anthia cuts and dedicates some of her hair to Helios during his festival at Rhodes. The Rhodians called shrine of Helios, Haleion. A colossal statue of the god, known as the Colossus of Rhodes and named as one of the Seven Wonders of the Ancient World, was erected in his honour and adorned the port of the city of Rhodes, like the modern Statue of Liberty that stands in the harbour of New York City, to which it was comparable in both size and stature.

The best of these are, first, the Colossus of Helius, of which the author of the iambic verse says, "seven times ten cubits in height, the work of Chares the Lindian"; but it now lies on the ground, having been thrown down by an earthquake and broken at the knees. In accordance with a certain oracle, the people did not raise it again.

It collapsed after an earthquake that hit Rhodes in 226 BC, and the Rhodians did not build it again, in accordance with an oracle.

In Rhodes, Helios seems to have absorbed the worship and cult of the island's local hero and mythical founder Tlepolemus. In ancient Greek city foundation, the use of the archegetes in its double sense of both founder and progenitor of a political order, or a polis, can be seen with Rhodes; real prominence was transferred from the local hero Tlepolemus, onto the god, Helios, with an appropriate myth explaining his relative insignificance; thus games originally celebrated for Tlepolemus were now given to Helios, who was seen as both ancestor and founder of the polis. For the Rhodian people, Tlepolemus was an archegetes and not a god, but he was offered sacrifices as if he were one; the rituals performed in his honour were of the kind commonly performed for a god. A sanctuary of Helios and the nymphs stood in Loryma near Lindos.

The priesthood of Helios was, at some point, appointed by lot, though in the great city a man and his two sons held the office of priesthood for the sun god in succession.

 Peloponnese 
The Dorians also seem to have revered Helios, and to have hosted His primary cult on the mainland. The scattering of cults of the sun god in Sicyon, Argos, Hermione, Epidaurus and Laconia, and his holy livestock flocks at Taenarum, seem to suggest that the deity was considerably important in Dorian religion, compared to other parts of ancient Greece. Additionally, it may have been the Dorians who brought his worship to Rhodes, as stated above.

Helios was an important god in Corinth and the greater Corinthia region. A reconstruction of Corinth's calendar from those used by its colonies reveals a summer month called "Of the [festival of the ?] Solstice", or Haliotropios in Greek (tropai = "solstice");  Each city in Ancient Greece had its own lunar-solar calendar organized around the annual solar cycle of solstices and equinoxes. Pausanias in his Description of Greece describes how Helios and Poseidon vied over the city, with Poseidon getting the isthmus of Corinth and Helios being awarded with the Acrocorinth. Helios' prominence in Corinth might go as back as Mycenaean times, and predate Poseidon's arrival or it might be due to Oriental immigration; it is hard to determine. At Sicyon, Helios had an altar behind Hera's sanctuary. It would seem that for the Corinthians, Helios was notable enough to even have control over thunder, which is otherwise the domain of the sky god Zeus.

Helios had a cult in Laconia as well. Taletos, a peak of Mt. Taygetus rising over Bryseae, was sacred to Helios and often horses were sacrificed in his name, similar to Persian cult traditions.Nagy, p. 100 n. 70 This sort of ritual was otherwise rare in Greece, but present in Rhodes as well. At Thalamae, nor far from Bryseae, Helios together with his daughter Pasiphaë were revered in an oracle, where the goddess revealed to the people consulting her what they needed to know  in their dreams. While the predominance of Helios in Sparta is currently unclear, it seems Helen was the local solar deity. Helios (and Selene's) worship in Gytheum, near Sparta, is attested by an inscription (C.I.G. 1392).

In Argolis, an altar was dedicated to Helios near Mycenae, and another in Troezen, where he was worshipped as the God of Freedom, seeing how the Troezenians had escaped slavery at the hands of Xerxes I. Over at Hermione stood a temple of his.Pausanias, Description of Greece 2.34.10 He appears to have also been venerated in Epidaurus.

In Arcadia, he had a cult in Megalopolis as the Saviour, and an altar near Mantineia.

 Elsewhere 
Traces of Helios's worship can also be found in Crete, dimly recalling the solar name of his daughter Pasiphaë, possibly Minoan in origin, though but a shadow of a great elemental god survives. In the earliest period Rhodes stood in close relations with Crete, and it is relatively safe to suggest that the name "Taletos", another worship center of Helios, is associated with the Eteocretan word for the sun "Talos", surviving in Zeus' epithet Tallaios, a solar aspect of the thunder god in Crete. Helios was also invoked in an oath of alliance between Knossos and Dreros.

In his little-attested cults in Asia Minor it seems his identification with Apollo was the strongest, based on evidence drawn from inscriptions or coins from Smyrna, Thyatira, Patara, Tralles and Phrygia (mostly dating from late Roman period and none from the Hellenistic). For example, at Didyma, the patron god Apollo Didymaeus also bore the epithets Helios and Phaesimbrotos, and their identification is also present in the founding myth of Apollo's oracle at Didyma where the mother of Apollo's lover and founder of Apollo's cult Branchus dreamt that the sun entered her throat and exited through her genitalia while pregnant to Branchus. It is possible that the solar elements of Apollo's Anatolian cults were influenced by Helios' cult in Rhodes, as Rhodes lies right off the southwest coast of Asia Minor.

Archaeological evidence has proven the existence of a shrine to Helios and Hemera, the goddess of the day and daylight, at the island of Kos and excavations have revealed traces of his cult at Sinope, Pozzuoli, Ostia and elsewhere. After a plague hit the city of Cleonae, in Phocis, Central Greece, the people there sacrificed a he-goat to Helios as he was rising under the guidance of the Oracle of Delphi, and true enough afterwards they were relieved from the plague.

Helios also had a cult in the region of Thessaly, attested in antiquity several times, such as in a dedication from Krannon, and a fragmentary inscription from Pherae. Plato in his Laws mentions the state of the Magnetes making a joint offering to Helios and Apollo, indicating a close relationship between the cults of those two gods, but it is clear that they were nevertheless distinct deities in Thessaly. Further north, he was one of the several gods worshipped at Philippi, in Macedonia.

Helios is also depicted on first century BC coins found at Halicarnassus, Syracuse in Sicily and at Zacynthus. From Pergamon originates a hymn to Helios in the style of Euripides and it is known that he had a small altar there at the sanctuary of Demeter, along with several other gods, possibly in connection with the Orphic mysteries.

In Apollonia of Illyria (in modern-day Albania) he was also venerated, as evidenced from Herodotus' account where a man named Evenius was harshly punished by his fellow citizens for allowing wolves to devour the flock of sheep sacred to the god out of negligence.

The inference suggested by his cult is that sun worship was once been prevalent and powerful among early Greek peoples and pre-Greeks, but very few communities kept those cults as a potent factor of their state-religion as time passed. The fact that he was not seen as a 'high god' in most poleis may reflect an aversion to worship of palpable objects, like with the cults of Gaia the earth, as worship of non-visible, non-material deities such as Zeus, Apollo and Athena was more in line with the Hellenic idea of godhood. However, during later period of Greco-Roman paganism one can discern a shift in this religious bias; a wave of Oriental influence brought certain back to the sun-god, leading to the rising of Sol Invictus in Rome. It is often impossible to determine how many of Helios' cults are the result of this later force/boost, as seen with his cult in Mantineia.

A passage from the Orphic Lithica mentions a ritual performed to Helios and Gaia by three young men who sacrifice a snake and then feast on it.

The Alexander Romance names a temple of Helios in the city of Alexandria.

 Other functions 
 In oath-keeping 

Helios is a god who both sees and hears everything, who can spy among gods and mortal men alike. Gods were often called upon by the Greeks when an oath was sworn; Helios is among the three deities (the other two being Zeus and Gaia) to be invoked in the Iliad to witness the truce between Greeks and Trojans. Due to his job as sun in the sky, he was in the position of witnessing everything on earth with his infallible eye, and it is thus fitting that he was widely invoked, along with Zeus, in oath-taking, making sure there was no escape if the oath was violated. For example, both are invoked in an oath at Eresos and in one by Eumenes I of Pergamon; a chthonic aspect of the god is apparent in the cases where he is invoked in oaths alongside subterranean gods and goddesses such as Hades, Gaia, Hecate and the Furies. Helios together with Zeus represent the sky, as Gaia and Demeter the earth.Mikalson, p. 84

The invocation of gods such as Earth and Sun is a very standard feature of such gods, and goes back to loyalty oaths originating from the Near East. He is also often appealed to in ancient drama to witness the unfolding events or take action, such as in Sophocles's Oedipus Rex and Euripides's Medea (the later also appeals to their kinship, being his granddaughter through his son Aeëtes). The notion of Helios as witness to oaths and vows also led to a view of Helios as a witness of wrong-doings, as when Prometheus calls upon him to see what he is suffering at the hands of other gods, or like in Aeschylus's play Agamemnon, where Agamemnon's son Orestes demands that the death robe be spread out so that Helios can see Orestes' mother Clytemnestra's impious actions, and even specialized to unadmitted love, as evidenced in a scholium on a black-figure vase from Aegina. He was thus seen as an emblem and guarantor of cosmic order, who can witness and avenge injustice happening under the sunlight.

Helios was invoked as a witness, among several other gods besides Zeus such as Ares, Athena and Poseidon, to several alliances such as the one between Athens and Cetriporis of Thrace, Lyppeus of Paeonia and Grabus of Illyria, in 357 BC, the one between Philip II of Macedon and Chalcidice in 357/6 BC, and the oaths of the League of Corinth. In a treaty between the cities of Smyrna and Magnesia, the Magnesians swore their oath by Helios among others. The combination of Zeus, Gaia and Helios in oath-swearing is also found among the non-Greek 'Royal Gods' in an agreement between Maussollus and Phaselis (360s BC) and in the Hellenistic period with the degree of Chremonides' announcing the alliance of Athens and Sparta invoking, along with these three, Athena, Ares, Demeter, and Poseidon.

 In magic 
He also had a role in necromancy magic. The Greek Magical Papyri contain several recipes for such, for example one which involves invoking the Sun over the skull-cup of a man who suffered a violent death; after the described ritual, Helios will then send the man's ghost to the practitioner to tell them everything they wish to know. Helios is also associated with Hecate in cursing magic. In some parts of Asia Minor Helios along with several other gods, and most commonly his counterpart Selene, were adjured not to permit any violation of the grave in tomb inscriptions and to warn potential violators not to desecrate the tomb, like one example from Elaeussa-Sebaste in Cilicia:

We adjure you by the heavenly god [Zeus] and Helios and Selene and the gods of the underworld, who receive us, that no one [. . .] will throw another corpse upon our bones.

Helios was also often invoked in funeral imprecations, ranking third in terms of frequency, after chthonic and lunar gods, and usually in the company of another lunar deity. Helios might have been chosen for this sort of magic because as an all-seeing god he could see everything on earth, even hidden crimes, and thus he was a very popular god to invoke in prayers for vengeance. Additionally, in ancient magic evil-averting aid and apotropaic defense were credited to Helios. Some magic rituals were associated with the engraving of images and stones, as with one such spell which asks Helios to consecrate the stone and fill with luck, honour, success and strength, thus giving the user incredible power.

Helios was also associated with love magic, much like Aphrodite, as there seems to have been another but rather poorly documented tradition of people asking him for help in such love matters, including homoerotic love and magical recipes invoking him for affection spells. Accordingly, a scholium on Theocritus claims that Pindar wrote that lovesick young men would pray to Helios for help as lovesick young women would pray to his sister Selene. Plutarch writes that Selene was called upon for love affairs because she is ever yearning for and pursuing her brother.

 In dreams 
It has been suggested that in Ancient Greece people would reveal their dreams to Helios and the sky or the air in order to avert any evil foretold or presaged in them as Clytemnestra does in Sophocles's Electra and the titular Iphigenia in Euripides' Iphigenia Among the Taurians,Cropp, p.176 however Harrison notes that not all examples from ancient texts supporting the claim are entirely convincing.

According to Artemidorus' Oneirocritica, the rich dreaming of transforming into a god was an auspicious sign, as long as the transformation had no deficiencies, citing the example of a man who dreamt he was Helios but wore a sun crown of just eleven rays. He wrote that the sun god was also an auspicious sign for the poor. In dreams, Helios could either appear in 'sensible' form (the orb of the sun) or his 'intelligible' form (the humanoid god).

 Late antiquity 

By Late Antiquity, Helios had accumulated a number of religious, mythological, and literary elements from other deities, particularly Apollo and the Roman sun god Sol. In 274 AD, on December 25, the Roman Emperor Aurelian instituted an official state cult to Sol Invictus (or Helios Megistos, "Great Helios"). This new cult drew together imagery not only associated with Helios and Sol, but also a number of syncretic elements from other deities formerly recognized as distinct. Other syncretic materials from this period include an Orphic Hymn to Helios; the so-called Mithras Liturgy, where Helios is said to rule the elements; spells and incantations invoking Helios among the Greek Magical Papyri; a Hymn to Helios by Proclus; Julian's Oration to Helios, the last stand of official paganism; and an episode in Nonnus' Dionysiaca. Helios in these works is frequently equated not only with deities such as Mithras and Harpocrates, but even with the monotheistic Judaeo-Christian god.

The last pagan emperor of Rome, Julian, made Helios the primary deity of his revived pagan religion, which combined elements of Mithraism with Neoplatonism. For Julian, Helios was a triunity: The One, which governs the highest realm containing Plato's Forms, or intelligible gods; Helios-Mithras, the supreme god of the Intellectual realm; and the Sun, the physical manifestation of Helios in the Encosmic, or visible realm. Because the primary location of Helios in this scheme was the "middle" realm, Julian considered him to be a mediator and unifier not just of the three realms of being, but of all things (which was a concept likely imported from Mithraism, and also may have been influenced by the Christian idea of the Logos). Julian's theological conception of Helios has been described as "practically monotheistic", in contrast to earlier Neoplatonists like Iamblichus, though he also included the other traditional gods worshiped around the ancient Mediterranean as both distinct entities and also certain principles or manifestations that emanate from Helios.

A mosaic found in the Vatican Necropolis (mausoleum M) depicts a figure very similar in style to Sol / Helios, crowned with solar rays and driving a solar chariot. Some scholars have interpreted this as a depiction of Christ, noting that Clement of Alexandria wrote of Christ driving his chariot across the sky. Some scholars doubt the Christian associations, or suggest that the figure is merely a non-religious representation of the sun.

 In the Greek Magical Papyri 

Helios figured prominently in the Greek Magical Papyri, a collection of hymns, rituals, and magic spells used from the 2nd century BC to the 5th century AD all around the Greco-Roman world. In these mostly fragmentary texts, Helios is credited with a broad domain, being regarded as the creator of life, the lord of the heavens and the cosmos, and the god of the sea. He is said to take the form of 12 animals representing each hour of the day, a motif also connected with the 12 signs of the zodiac.

The Papyri often syncretize Helios with a variety of related deities. He is described as "seated on a lotus, decorated with rays", in the manner of Harpocrates, who was often depicted seated on a lotus flower, representing the rising sun. According to the Neoplatonist philosopher Iamblichus, "sitting on a lotus implies pre-eminence over the mud, without ever touching the mud, and also displays intellectual and empyrean leadership."

Helios is also assimilated with Mithras in some of the Papyri, as he was by Emperor Julian. The Mithras Liturgy combines them as Helios-Mithras, who is said to have revealed the secrets of immortality to the magician who wrote the text. Some of the texts describe Helios Mithras navigating the Sun's path not in a chariot but in a boat, an apparent identification with the Egyptian sun god Ra. Helios is also described as "restraining the serpent", likely a reference to Apophis, the serpent god who, in Egyptian myth, is said to attack Ra's ship during his nightly journey through the underworld.

In many of the Papyri, Helios is also strongly identified with Iao, a name derived from that of the Hebrew god Yahweh, and shares several of his titles including Sabaoth and Adonai. He is also assimilated as the Agathos Daemon (called "the Agathodaimon, the god of the gods"), who is also identified elsewhere in the texts as "the greatest god, lord Horus Harpokrates".

The Neoplatonist philosophers Proclus and Iamblichus attempted to interpret many of the syntheses found in the Greek Magical Papyri and other writings that regarded Helios as all-encompassing, with the attributes of many other divine entities. Proclus described Helios as a cosmic god consisting of many forms and traits. These are "coiled up" within his being, and are variously distributed to all that "participate in his nature", including angels, daemons, souls, animals, herbs, and stones. All of these things were important to the Neoplatonic practice of theurgy, magical rituals intended to invoke the gods in order to ultimately achieve union with them. Iamblichus noted that theurgy often involved the use of "stones, plants, animals, aromatic substances, and other such things holy and perfect and godlike." For theurgists, the elemental power of these items sacred to particular gods utilizes a kind of sympathetic magic.

 Epithets 

The Greek sun god had various bynames or epithets, which over time in some cases came to be considered separate deities associated with the Sun. Among these are:

Acamas ("Akàmas"), meaning "tireless, unwearying", as he repeats his never-ending routine day after day without cease.

Apollo ("Apóllōn") here understood to mean "destroyer", the sun as a more destructive force.

Callilampetes ("Kallilampétēs"), "he who glows lovely".

Elasippus ("Elásippos"), meaning "horse-driving".

Elector ("Ēléktōr") of uncertain derivation (compare Electra), often translated as "beaming" or "radiant", especially in the combination Ēlektōr Hyperiōn.

Eleutherius ("Eleuthérios) "the liberator", epithet under which he was worshipped in Troezen in Argolis, also shared with Dionysus and Eros.

Hagnus (Hagnós), meaning "pure", "sacred" or "purifying."

Hecatus ("Hékatos"), "from afar," also Hecatebolus ("Hekatḗbolos")  "the far-shooter", i.e. the sun's rays considered as arrows.

Horotrophus ("Hо̄rotróphos"), "nurturer of the Seasons/Hours", in combination with kouros, "youth".

Hyperion ("Hyperíōn") and Hyperionides ("Hyperionídēs"), "superus, high up" and "son of Hyperion" respectively, the sun as the one who is above, and also the name of his father.

Isodaetes ("Isodaítēs"), literally "he that distributes equal portions", cult epithet also shared with Dionysus.

Paean (Paiān), physician, healer, a healing god and an epithet of Apollo and Asclepius.

Panoptes ("Panóptēs") "all-seeing" and Pantepoptes ("Pantepóptēs") "all-supervising", as the one who witnessed everything that happened on earth.

Pasiphaes ("Pasiphaḗs"), "all-shining", also the name of one of his daughters.

Patrius ("Pátrios") "of the fathers, ancestral", related to his role as primogenitor of royal lines in several places.

Phaethon ("Phaéthōn") "the radiant", "the shining", also the name of his son and daughter.

Phasimbrotus ("Phasímbrotos") "he who sheds light to the mortals", the sun.

Philonamatus ("Philonámatos") "water-loving", a reference to him rising from and setting in the ocean.

Phoebus (Phoîbos), literally "bright", several Roman authors applied Apollo's byname to their sun god Sol.

Sirius ("Seírios") literally meaning "scorching", and also the name of the Dog Star.Diggle p. 138

Soter ("Sōtḗr") "the saviour", epithet under which he was worshipped in Megalopolis, Arcadia.

Terpsimbrotus ("Terpsímbrotos") "he who gladdens mortals", with his warm, life-giving beams.

Titan ("Titán"), possibly connected to τιτώ meaning "day" and thus "god of the day".

Whether Apollo's epithets Aegletes and Asgelatas in the island of Anaphe, both connected to light, were borrowed from epithets of Helios either directly or indirectly is hard to say.

 Identification with other gods 
 Apollo 

Helios is sometimes identified with Apollo: "Different names may refer to the same being," Walter Burkert argues, "or else they may be consciously equated, as in the case of Apollo and Helios." Apollo was associated with the Sun as early as the fifth century BC, though widespread conflation between him and the Sun god was a later phaenomenon.

In Homeric literature, Apollo was clearly identified as a different god, a plague-dealer with a silver bow, rather than a golden one and no solar features. The earliest certain reference to Apollo being identified with Helios appears in the surviving fragments of Euripides' play Phaethon in a speech near the end – Clymene, Phaethon's mother, laments that Helios has destroyed her child, that Helios whom men rightly call Apollo (the name Apollo is here understood to mean Apollon "Destroyer").

By Hellenistic times Apollo had become closely connected with the Sun in cult and Phoebus (Greek Φοῖβος, "bright"), the epithet most commonly given to Apollo, was later applied by Latin poets to the Sun-god Sol.

The identification became a commonplace in philosophic texts and appears in the writing of Parmenides, Empedocles, Plutarch and Crates of Thebes among others, as well as appearing in some Orphic texts. Pseudo-Eratosthenes writes about Orpheus in Placings Among the Stars, section 24:

But having gone down into Hades because of his wife and seeing what sort of things were there, he did not continue to worship Dionysus, because of whom he was famous, but he thought Helios to be the greatest of the gods, Helios whom he also addressed as Apollo. Rousing himself each night toward dawn and climbing the mountain called Pangaion, he would await the Sun's rising, so that he might see it first. Therefore, Dionysus, being angry with him, sent the Bassarides, as Aeschylus the tragedian says; they tore him apart and scattered the limbs.

Dionysus and Asclepius are sometimes also identified with this Apollo Helios.Guthrie, p. 43, says "The Orphics never had the power to bring it about, but it was their purpose to foster it, and in their syncretistic literature they identified the two gods [i.e. Apollo and Dionysus] by giving out that both alike were Helios, the Sun. Helios = supreme god = Dionysus = Apollo (cp. Kern, Orpheus, 7). So at least the later writers say. Olympiodoros (O.F. 212) speaks of 'Helios, who according to Orpheus has much in common with Dionysos through the medium of Apollo', and according to Proklos (O.F. 172) 'Orpheus makes Helios very much the same as Apollo, and worship the fellowship of these gods'. Helios and Dionysos are identified in Orphic lines (O.F. 236, 239)."

Strabo wrote that Artemis and Apollo were associated with Selene and Helios respectively due to the changes those two celestial bodies caused in the temperature of the air, as the twins were gods of pestilential diseases and sudden deaths. Pausanias also linked Apollo's association with Helios as a result of his profession as a healing god, and father to Asclepius.  The two gods' close association with each other might have originated from the fact that both were supposed to know everything, one from his position in the sky above the earth, the other as god of prophecy. The light that comes from the Sun is physical and at the same time metaphorical, signifying mental enlightenment; in that respect, the mental and physical phenomena are made distinct from each other, a distinction which placed the two gods on opposing sides: thus Apollo is the metaphorical light, the oracular god who sheds light into the dark ways of the future, the god of music and song (which are heard where light and security reigns), while Helios on the other hand represents the physical light, the orb of the Sun that creates summer and winter, who brings dark secrets to the light, as demonstrated in the story of Aphrodite and Hephaestus, when he rises and sets in the sky. In the Orphic Hymns, Helios is addressed as Paean ("healer") and holding a golden lyre, both common descriptions for Apollo; similarly Apollo in his own hymn is described as Titan and shedding light to the mortals, both common epithets of Helios.

According to Athenaeus, sixth century BC lyric poet Telesilla wrote that the song sung in honour of Apollo is called the "Sun-loving song" (philhēliás),  that is, a song meant to make the Sun come forth from the clouds, sung by children in bad weather; but Julius Pollux (who came much later than her) describing a philhelias in greater detail makes no mention of Apollo, only Helios. Scythinus of Teos wrote that Apollo uses the bright light of the Sun as his harp-quill and in a fragment of Timotheus' lyric, Helios is invoked as an archer with the invocation  (a common way of addressing the two medicine gods), though it most likely was part of esoteric doctrine, rather than a popular and widespread belief. Scholia on Homer's Iliad report that during the Theomachy in song 21, where Poseidon fights Apollo, Apollo here represents the partial fire, that is the Sun, against the full of water (the whole of fire versus the partial water is represented by Hephaestus fighting the Scamander river).Anecdota græca e codd. manuscriptis Bibliothecæ regiæ parisiensis, p. 120 Aeschylus in his Seven Against Thebes writes that Apollo never walks in the Underworld, and calls the place Sunless (análion "sunless"). Similarly, Helios never steps foot on the Underworld either:

Sleep and Death, awful gods. The glowing Sun never looks upon them with his beams, neither as he goes up into heaven, nor as he comes down from heaven.

During the time of Callimachus, an ancient Greek poet who lived in the 4th century BC, some people would distinguish between Apollo and Helios, for which thing the poet censured them. Classical Latin poets also used Phoebus as a byname for the Sun-god, whence come common references in later European poetry to Phoebus and his chariot as a metaphor for the Sun but, in particular instances in myth, Apollo and Helios are distinct. The Sun-god, the son of Hyperion, with his Sun chariot, though often called Phoebus ("shining") is not called Apollo except in purposeful non-traditional identifications. Ancient Roman authors who used "Phoebus" for Sol as well as Apollo include Ovid, Virgil, Statius, and Seneca. Representations of Apollo with solar rays around his head in art also belong to the time of the Roman Empire, particularly under Emperor Elagabalus in 218-222 AD.

Ovid is largely responsible for the prevalence of the idea of Apollo being the Sun god in modern times, however he himself did not identify Apollo with Sol in his works. Apollo, has far as Ovid is concerned, does not seem to have any solar characteristics. Ovid gives Apollo attributes such as bow, arrows and lyre, but never Sun-chariot, and has the oracular god often seen busy during the daytime, such as in the story where he plays a game with Hyacinthus, where the Sun is mentioned as separate from him, which would have been impossible to do if he had to drive the chariot. In Ovid, Sol appears in significantly fewer stories than Apollo, but when he does he is distinct from him. He is called the son of Hyperion, the brother of Luna, the father of Circe and Pasiphaë, and the only epithet he shares with Apollo is "Phoebus", which Otfried Müller and Farnell argued it is not related to the Sun, but was applied to him because it made for a fitting epithet; and besides, Fontenrose argues, Ovid is unlikely to have thought Latona, Circe, Pyrrha and Diana as the same figure simply because he uses "Titania" for all four. The one time they seem to be thought of as the same is a passage in the story of Callisto:

The brother is no doubt the Sun, Ovid apparently at first glance naming Diana as the Sun's sister; but in the very same passage, the Moon/Luna is mentioned, which may be the reason Ovid would use the word "brother" seemingly in relation to Diana in what is a verse about Sol.

 Usil 

The Etruscan god of the Sun, equivalent to Helios, was Usil. His name appears on the bronze liver of Piacenza, next to Tiur, the Moon. He appears, rising out of the sea, with a fireball in either outstretched hand, on an engraved Etruscan bronze mirror in late Archaic style, formerly on the Roman antiquities market. On Etruscan mirrors in Classical style, he appears with a halo. In ancient artwork, Usil is shown in close association with Thesan, the goddess of the dawn, something almost never seen with Helios and Eos, however in the area between Cetona and Chiusi a stone obelisk is found (kept since 1622 in the monastery of San Francesco at Città della Pieve), whose relief decorations seem to have been interpreted as referring to a solar sanctuary: what appears to be a Sun boat, the heads of Helios and Thesan, and a cock, likewise referring to the Sunrise.

 Zeus 

Helios is also sometimes conflated in classical literature with the highest Olympian god, Zeus. An attested cult epithet of Zeus is Aleios Zeus, or "Zeus the Sun," from the Doric form of Helios' name. The inscribed base of Mammia's dedication to Helios and Zeus Meilichios, dating from the fourth or third century BC, is a fairly and unusually early evidence of the conjoint worship of Helios and Zeus; Helios was identified with Zeus as the absolute master of the universe, who could even hold power over the Moirai, the goddesses of fate. According to Plutarch's Quaestiones Romanae section from his Moralia, Helios is Zeus in his material form that one can interact with, and that's why Zeus owns the year (accordingly, his sister Selene is Queen Hera in her material form, and owns the months), while the chorus in Euripides' Medea also link him to Zeus when they refer to Helios as "light born from Zeus" and in his now lost tragedy Mysians, Euripides described Zeus as "Sun-eyed", while Helios is said elsewhere to be "the brilliant eye of Zeus, giver of life". In his Orphic hymn, Helios is addressed as "immortal Zeus". In Crete, the cult of Zeus Tallaios had incorporated several solar elements into his worship; "Talos" was the local equivalent of Helios. Hesychius of Alexandria wrote that "Talos" was another word for the Sun. Helios is referred either directly as Zeus' eye, or clearly implied to be. For instance, Hesiod effectively describes Zeus's eye as the Sun. This perception is possibly derived from earlier Proto-Indo-European religion, in which the Sun is believed to have been envisioned as the eye of *Dyḗus Pḥatḗr (see Hvare-khshaeta). An Orphic saying, supposedly given by an oracle of Apollo, goes:

 "Zeus, Hades, Helios-Dionysus, three gods in one godhead!"

Although the connection of Helios to Zeus does not seem to have basis in early Greek cult and writings, nevertheless there are many examples of direct identification in later times. The Hellenistic period gave birth to Serapis, a Greco-Egyptian deity conceived by the Greeks as a chthonic aspect of Zeus, whose solar nature is indicated by the Sun crown and rays the Greeks depicted him with. Several Greek deities contributed to Serapis' "godhood" in addition to those two, like Asclepius, Dionysus and Hades; from Zeus and Helios Serapis draws his aspects of sovereignty and sun god. Frequent joint dedications to "Zeus-Serapis-Helios" have been found all over the Mediterranean, for example, the Anastasy papyrus (now housed in the British Museum) equates Helios to not just Zeus and Serapis but also Mithras, and a series of inscriptions from Trachonitis give evidence of the cult of "Zeus the Unconquered Sun". There is evidence of Zeus being worshipped as a solar god in the Aegean island of Amorgos, based  on a lacunose inscription  ("Zeus the Sun"), which, if correct, could mean that Sun elements in Zeus' worship could be as early as the fifth century BC.

An offering made to Zeus-Helios, who had an established cult in Anatolia, was found in a votive inscription east of ancient Sinope, and in Ostia, Serapis was depicted on a disc sporting a corona radiata, in the manner of Helios. A joint dedication to "Zeus Helios Megas Serapis" was found on a gazophylakion in a street market in Alexandria. The subject of the inscription, in side A of the block, is a dedication of a gazophylakion and several objects to those gods made by Publius Iulius Pius, a centurio cohortis of a Liburnian ship.

When quoting this in his Hymn to King Helios, Emperor Julian replaced the compound name Helios-Dionysus with Serapis, whose native Egyptian counterpart Osiris was identified with Dionysus. On the basis of this oracle, Julian concluded that "among the intellectual gods, Helios and Zeus have a joint or rather a single sovereignty." The common identity of the two gods is apparent in several of the emperor's works, for example his Against the Galileans where Zeus and Helios are jointly the parents of Asclepius, the god of medicine; in To The Mother of the Gods Zeus and Helios are interchangeably named as the consort and co-ruler of the Anatolian mother goddess Cybele; and in Against Heracleios, when Julian asks Zeus which is the way leading to him, Zeus simply appoints Helios. Julian also observed that in the Odyssey, when Helios threatened Zeus to shine among the dead in the Underworld should his wishes not be heard after his sacred cows had been devoured, Zeus gave in straight away, and did not boast of his strength and superior power as he did when he confronted the other Olympian gods in the Iliad, and instead tells Helios to continue shedding his light to the world.

In Orphic theology, Zeus is equated with Helios (among several other gods and concepts) in order to highlight Zeus' universality.

 Hades 
Helios seems to have been connected to some degree with Hades, the god of the Underworld. A dedicatory inscription from Smyrna (modern day İzmir in Turkey) describes a 1st–2nd century sanctuary to "God Himself" as the most exalted of a group of six deities, including clothed statues of Plouton Helios and Koure Selene, or in other words "Pluto the Sun" and "Kore the Moon". As for the other gods and goddesses, those include Helios Apollon, who is paired with his twin sister Artemis; Zeus, who is subordinated to "God Himself"; and Men, an Anatolian Moon deity (a god often identified with SeleneFrede and Laks, p. 200); Men is also sometimes identified with another Anatolian import, Attis (the consort of the mother goddess Cybele), who had a table before him for ceremonial dining. Plouton Helios is mentioned in other literary sources as well; he is associated with Koure Selene and Helios Apollon; the Sun on its nighttime course, while coming back from the west, was sometimes envisioned as travelling through the Underworld on its return to the east for the next day. Roman poet Apuleius describes a rite in which the Sun appears at midnight to the initiate at the gates of Proserpina; the suggestion here is that this midnight Sun could be Plouton Helios. Evidence comes from Smyrna, where the father of a great priest of Helios Apollo donated statues of this god, Artemis and Men, as many artefacts, altars and temples with images of Pluto-Helios and Koure-Selene, and a key carried in the procession; Pluto-Helios seems to reflect the Egyptian idea of the nocturnal Sun that penetrated the realm of the dead.

An old oracle from Claros said that the names of Zeus, Hades, Helios, Dionysus and Jao all represented the Sun at different seasons. Macrobius wrote that Iao/Jao is "Hades in winter, Zeus in spring, Helios in summer, and Iao in autumn."

 Cronus 
Diodorus Siculus reported that the Chaldeans called Cronus (Saturnus) by the name Helios, or the Sun, and he explained that this was because Saturn was the "most conspicuous" of the planets.

 Iconography 
 Depiction and symbols 

Helios often appears in ancient pottery and coins. The earliest depictions of Helios in a humanoid form date from the late sixth and early fifth centuries BC in Attic black-figure vases, and typically show him frontally as a bearded man on his chariot with a sun disk. A red-figure on a polychrome bobbin by a follower of the Brygos painter already signifies a shift in the god's depiction, painting him as a youthful, beardless figure, while an Attic column krater now kept in the Detroit Institute of Arts is among the earliest examples of a shift in Helios' depiction from frontal to profile, though it did keep the bearded man imagery. Likewise a late sixth century or early fifth century BC lekythos attributed to the Sappho Painter shows him as a bearded male, his long hair bound up in a krobylos, holding a goad and wearing a finely pleated long linen tunic of a charioteer. In later art, he is consistently drawn as beardless and young. In it, he is typically depicted with a radiant crown; a radiate god, with the right hand often raised, a gesture of power (which came to be a definitional feature of solar iconography), the left hand usually holding a whip or a globe. By the middle of the fifth century BC Helios has lost his beard, as his identification with the youthful, fair Apollo has begun, however Helios is still depicted with a face fuller than Apollo's. In Rhodian coins, he was shown as beardless god, with thick and flowing hair, surrounded by beams. He was also presented as a young man clad in tunic, with curling hair and wearing buskins. While early depictions of Helios would show him holding a whip and reins of the quadriga, later ones supplant the whip and reins for a globe on the left hand and a raised right hand. Just like Selene, who is sometimes depicted with a lunar disk rather than a crescent, Helios too has his own solar one instead of a sun crown in some depictions, which radiates, unlike Selene's own which does not. It is likely that Helios' later image as a warrior-charioteer might be traced back to the Mycenaean period; the symbol of the disc of the sun is displayed in scenes of rituals from both Mycenae and Tiryns, and large amounts of chariots used by the Mycenaeans are recorded in Linear B tablets.

In archaic art, Helios rising in his chariot was a type of motive. Helios in ancient pottery is usually depicted rising from the sea in his four-horse chariot, either as a single figure or connecting to some myth, indicating that it takes place at dawn; often he is accompanied by Selene (Moon), Eos (Dawn), Hemera (Day) and the Stars. He is often present at the abduction of Persephone, the Judgement of Paris, and Heracles shooting arrows at him. In an Attic black-figure vase, now kept at the National Archaeological Museum of Taranto in Italy, attributed to the Theseus Painter, shows Heracles sitting on the shores of the Ocean river, while next to him a pair of arrows protrude from Helios, crowned with a solar disk and driving his chariot.

Helios adorned the east pediment of the Parthenon; he along with Selene framed the scene of the birth of Athena, he, with only his head and arms shown, driving his quadriga on the left as he rises from the ocean, while she in her biga descending into the sea on the far right.Palagia, pp 18–19 Helios (again with Selene) also framed the birth of Aphrodite on the base of the Statue of Zeus at Olympia,Pausanias, Description of Greece 5.11.8 the Judgement of Paris, and possibly the birth of Pandora on the base of the Athena Parthenos statue. They were also featured in the pedimental group of the temple at Delphi. In the Pergamon Altar, depicting the Gigantomachy, the charioteer with the fluttering robes guiding his four-horse chariot while swinging a flaming torch at his enemy is doubtlessly Helios. In dynamic Hellenistic art, Helios along with other luminary deities and Rhea-Cybele, representing reason, battle the Giants (who represent irrationality).

The ancient sculptor Lysippus, teacher of Chares of Lindos (who built the Colossus of Rhodes) was celebrated for many his statues, more particularly for his Chariot with the Sun, another large statue of the god which stood in Rhodes.de Grummond, p. 96 In Elis near the market place he was depicted with rays coming out of his head in an image made of wood with gilded clothing and marble head, hands and feet. Outside the market of the city of Corinth, along the road to Lechaeum, stood a gateway on which stood two gilded chariots; one carrying Helios' son Phaethon, the other Helios himself.

Helios appears infrequently in gold jewelry before Roman times; extant examples include a gold medallion with its bust from the Gulf of Elaia in Anatolia, where he's depicted frontally with a head of unruly hair, and a golden medallion of the Pelinna necklace. The most famous representations of Helios, namely his statue in the east pediment of the Parthenon, Lysippus' chariot statue for the Rhodians and the Colossus of Rhodes were sources of inspiration for various other artworks of Helios in antiquity; the Pelinna medallion may also be following that same tradition.

The association of Alexander's features with solar iconography are maybe set around the time of Lysippus' Chariot with the Sun and Chares' Colossus; Alexander-like facial features can be traced on the fourth century-onward Rhodian coins depicting Helios' sun-crowned head; many Hellenistic and Roman images of Helios and then Mithras derive their facial features from Alexander. His iconography, used by the Ptolemies after representations of Alexander the Great as Alexander-Helios, came to symbolize power and epiphany, and was borrowed by several Egyptian deities in the Roman period. Other rulers who had their portraits done with solar features include Ptolemy III Euergetes, one of the Ptolemaic kings of Egypt, of whom a bust with holes in the fillet for the sunrays and gold coins depicting him with a radiant halo on his head like Helios and holding the aegis exist.C. Vermeule and D. von Bothmer, "Notes on a New Edition of Michaelis: Ancient Marbles in Great Britain." American Journal of Archaeology vol. 63, no. 2 (1959): p. 146

 Late Roman era 

Helios was also frequently depicted in mosaics, usually surrounded by the twelve zodiac signs and accompanied by Selene. From the third and fourth centuries CE onwards, the sun god was seen as an official imperial Roman god and thus appeared in various forms in monumental artworks, portrayed wearing a radiant crown signifying the sun's rays and driving a quadriga. The cult of Helios/Sol had a notable function in Eretz Israel; since the Emperor was regarded as the ruler of the world, he figure's right-handed greeting was recognized as a symbol of power; Helios was Constantine the Great's patron, and so that ruler came to be identified with Helios. In his new capital city, Constantinople, Constantine recycled a statue of Helios to represent himself in his portrait, as Nero had done with Sol, which was not an uncommon practice among pagans, and the position of the emperors in the Arch of Galerius is comparable to the position of Helios/Sol on the Dieberg plaque, and also in coinage. A considerable portion if not the majority of Jewish Helios material dates from the 3rd through the 6th centuries CE, including numerous mosaics of the god in Jewish synagogues and invocation in papyri.

The sun god was depicted in mosaics in three places of the Land of Israel; at the synagogues of Hammat Tiberias, Beth Alpha and Naaran. In the mosaic of the Hammat Tiberias, Helios is wrapped in a partially gilded tunic fastened with a fibula and sporting a seven-rayed halo with his right hand uplifted, while his left holds a globe and a whip; his chariot is drawn as a frontal box with two large wheels pulled by four horses. At the Beth Alpha synagogue, Helios is at the centre of the circle of the zodiac mosaic, together with the Torah shrine between menorahs, other ritual objects, and a pair of lions, while the Seasons are in spandrels. The frontal head of Helios emerges from the chariot box, with two wheels in side view beneath, and the four heads of the horses, likewise frontal, surmounting an array of legs. In the synagogue of Naaran, the god is dressed in a white tunic embellished with gemstones on the upper body; over the tunic is a paludamentum pinned with a fibula or bulla and decorated with a star motif, as he holds in his hand a scarf, the distinctive symbol of a ruler from the fourth century onward, and much like all other mosaics he's seated in his four-horse chariot. Temporary writings record "the sun has three letters of [God's] name written at its heart and the angels lead it" and "[t]he sun is riding on a chariot and rises decorated like a bridegroom". Both at Naaran and Beth Alpha the image of the sun is presented in a bust in frontal position, and a crown with nimbus and rays on his head. Helios at both Hammath Tiberias and Beth Alpha is depicted with seven rays emanating from his head, it has been argued that those two are significantly different; the Helios of Hammath Tiberias possesses all the attributes of Sol Invictus and thus the Roman emperors, those being the rayed crown, the raised right hand and the globe, all common Helios-Sol iconography of the late third and early fourth centuries AD.

Helios and Selene were also personified in the mosaic of the Monastery of Lady Mary at Beit She'an, where he is crowned with a seven-rayed halo while she wears a crescent upon her head, both holding flaming torches, surrounded by the personifications of the twelve months. His, on the left representing the day, is the bust portraying a bearded male wearing a tunic and a chlamys. Here he is not shown as Sol Invictus, the Unconquered Sun, but rather as a celestial body; he is the guardian of creation and changing of the seasons, his red hair symbolizing the sun.

 In post-antiquity art 
 In painting 

Helios/Sol had little independent identity and presence during the Renaissance, where the main solar gods were Apollo, Bacchus and Hercules; the identification between Helios and Apollo had started since antiquity, and though the two were not necessarily identical, distinguishing between Apollo-Diana and their heavenly counterparts Sol and Luna became too confusing for most people during the Renaissance. In post-antiquity art, Apollo assimilates features and attributes of both classical Apollo and Helios, so that Apollo, along with his own iconography, is many times depicted as driving the four-horse chariot, representing both of them. In baroque painting, Apollo is often depicted with his prancing horses, surrounded by sunlight, driving Diana, representing the moon goddess and identified with Helios' sister Selene, away from the sky and into darkness; otherwise, Apollo might be seated on a cloud, with his lyre and Diana next to him. In medieval tradition, each of the four horses had its own distinctive colour; in the Renaissance however, all four are shown as white, similar to those used to pull the Roman triumphal four-horse chariots.Hall, p. 66 In Versailles, in the great fountain of Apollo, a gilded statue of him depicts Apollo as the god of the sun, driving his quadriga as he sinks in the ocean; Apollo in this regard represents the king of France, le roi-soleil, "the Sun King".

In the same vein, Apollo is sometimes depicted with Eos/Aurora, the goddess of the dawn and the other one of Helios' sisters other than Selene; in a drawing by Italian painter Lelio Orsi from circa 1544–1545, the god Apollo leads his quadriga, loosely holding onto the reins of the chariot with a bow and quiver slung over his left shoulder; Aurora, buoyed on a pillow of cloud, precedes the chariot, as she announced his arrival, strewing flowers in Apollo's path, as behind them emerges the semicircle of the rising sun, its rays illuminating the horses as well as the forms of Apollo and Aurora. The ceiling fresco L'Aurora by Italian painter Guido Reni, painted in 1614, is another example of a Baroque painting where Eos/Aurora is seen leading Apollo, who is surrounded by the Hours and a luminous halo.

Additionally to the chariot, Apollo is often drawn with a solar halo around his head and depicted in scenes of Helios' mythology, like informing Vulcan of Venus's affair with Mars, seducing Leucothoe or refusing to look at Clytie as she looks longingly upon him, or being accompanied by Aurora, the goddess of the dawn who opens the gates for him to pass through each morning. Accordingly, in depictions of Phaethon meeting his father and asking him the privilege of driving the sun chariot, artists gave to Phaethon's father the appearance and attributes of Apollo, despite his genealogy; thus Apollo the sun god is shown sitting on a throne of clouds, with a lyre ever by his side. Giambattista Tiepolo, an Italian artist, painted oil on canvas the psychological moment when Phaethon made his daring wish, where Apollo, as the father, bathed in an aureole of light, vainly attempts to dissuade his son while the boy gestures at his father's horses, as described by Ovid; his golden chariot and horses are there too, as he is attended by the winged Horae, the goddesses of the seasons, and Saturn, here the god of time.

 In literature 

A love affair between the Sun god and the Nereid Amphitrite is introduced by French playwright Monléon's L'Amphytrite (1630); in the denouement, the Sun, scorned by the nymph, sets the land and sea ablaze, before the king of gods Jupiter intervenes and restores peace. In Jean-Gilbert Durval's Le Travaux d'Ulysse (1631), whose primary sources were not the Odyssey, but a series of well-known paintings of the titular Odysseus' adventures, after his men dine on the sacred sheep, the Sun appears in 'a chariot of light', accompanied by Jupiter  on his throne of glory; like in the myth, Jupiter kills Odysseus' crewmen with his lightning bolts when they put to sea again.

French composer Jean-Baptiste Lully wrote in 1683 a tragédie en musique in five acts inspired by Ovid's handling of the tale of Helios' son, Phaëton, in which Phaëton obtains from his father the sun chariot in order to prove his divine origins to his rival Epaphus, but loses control and is instead struck and killed by Jupiter. The role of the father, le Soleil (the Sun) was played by a tenor (haute-contre). In the fourth act, the Sun, surrounded by the Horae, warmly receives his son, and after the festivities, he rashly accepts to give Phaeton a sign of fatherhood, only to quickly foresee the consequences once the boy expresses his wish, but is unable to go back on his word. The luxury of the Sun and his palace was no doubt meant to connect to the Sun King, Louis XIV, who used the sun for his emblem; the play was an indirect reference to the fate of Nicolas Fouquet, whose ambition to imitate Louis XIV brought about his downfall. This Apollo-Sun was frequently used to represent Louis XIV's reign; in Pierre Corneille's Andromède (1650), the Muse Melpomene stops the Sun to make him shine in the theatre, embellished with the finest art of France and Italy, and he predicts that King Louis XIV will achieve greater glory than Pompey, Alexander the Great and Julius Caesar.

Gerhart Hauptmann wrote a long poem Helios und Phaethon, which, unlike other retellings of the myth, omits entirely the cosmic disaster Phaethon caused in order to focus on the relationship between the divine father and his mortal son, as Phaethon tries to convince his father he is well-suited for his five steeds, while Helios tries to dissuade his ambitious child, but eventually consents and gives him his reins and steeds to drive for a single day. In James Joyce's book Ulysses, episode 14 is titled Oxen of the Sun, after the story of Odysseus' men and the cattle of Helios in book twelve of the Odyssey. The episode takes place in late morning at the Holles Street Maternity Hospital, and its symbolism is perhaps the most challenging in the book; the young men that gathered in the maternity hospital, due to their indecent behavior, feel like they committed a sacrilege against the women in labour that were giving birth to new life in the hospital; those mothers were held as sacred, akin to symbols of fertility, not unlike the sacred cattle of Helios whom the mortal crew so impiously slew and ate.

 Namesakes 
 In astronomy 
Helios is the Greek proper name for the Sun for both Ancient and Modern Greek, and additionally Helios, one of the craters of Hyperion, a moon of Saturn which bears Helios' father's name, is named after this Greek god. Several words relating to the Sun derive from "helios", including the rare adjective heliac (meaning "solar"), heliosphere, perihelion and aphelion among others.

 In science 
The chemical element Helium, a colorless, odorless, tasteless, non-toxic, inert, monatomic gas, first in the noble gas group in the periodic table, was named after Helios by Norman Lockyer and Edward Frankland, as it was first observed in the spectrum of the chromosphere of the Sun. Helium makes up for about 25% of the Sun's mass.

 In taxonomy 
Helius is a genus of crane fly in the family Limoniidae that shares its name with the god.

 In spaceflight 

A pair of probes that were launched into heliocentric orbit by NASA to study solar processes were called Helios A and Helios B after this god. They were launched from Cape Canaveral Air Force Station, Florida, on December 10, 1974, and January 15, 1976, respectively. Those probes are no longer functional yet remain in their elliptical orbits around the Sun.NASA Space Science Data Coordinated Archive and NASA Space Science Data Coordinated Archive Note that there is no "Epoch end" date given, which is NASA's way of saying it is still in orbit.

 In wine-making 
Orinos Helios ("mountainous sun") is the name of a brand of wine in Greece, produced in Domaine Helios in Nemea.

 In media 
In the Wii game Metroid Prime 3: Corruption, the second Seed guardian is named after Helios. In the Dues Ex series, there is an AI named after Helios. In China, a crime thriller named Helios directed by Longman Leung was released in 2015.

 Modern reception 

Helios often appears in modern and popular culture due to his status as the god of the sun.

 Postclassical art and literature 
 Books 
Helios has been potrayed in many modern works of literature such as in Gareth Hinds' 2010 version of The Odyssey and in 2018's The Burning Maze in The Trials of Apollo series by Rick Riordan.

 Webcomic 
Helios has appeared in webcomics, such as Lore Olympus by Rachel Smythe.

 Video Games 
Helios has been protrayed in many video games, Such as in Sony Computer Entertainment's God of War: Chains of Olympus, God of War II and God of War III where the character is a boss and plays an antagonist role against Kratos.

 Music 
Helios has had an effect on modern music. An electronic musician Vektroid under the alias Macintosh Plus, used an edited bust of Helios in their 2011 vaporwave album Floral Shoppe's cover.

 Gallery 

 Genealogy 

 See also 

 Ah! Sun-flower
 Amaterasu
 Amshuman
 Five Suns (mythology)
 Guaraci
 Heliopolis, particularly
 Heliopolis in Egypt
 Heliopolis in Lebanon
 Korouhanba
 Piltzintecuhtli (mythology)
 List of solar deities
 Solar Myths

 Notes 

 References 

 Bibliography 
 Primary sources 

 Aelian, On Animals, Volume II: Books 6-11, translated by A. F. Scholfield, Loeb Classical Library No. 450, Cambridge, Massachusetts, Harvard University Press, 1959.  Online version at Harvard University Press.
 Aelian, On Animals, Volume III: Books 12-17, translated by A. F. Scholfield, Loeb Classical Library No. 449, Cambridge, Massachusetts, Harvard University Press, 1959.  Online version at Harvard University Press. .
 Aeschylus, Fragments. Edited and translated by Alan H. Sommerstein. Loeb Classical Library 505. Cambridge, MA: Harvard University Press, 2009. .
 Aeschylus, Persians. Seven Against Thebes. Suppliants. Prometheus Bound. Edited and translated by Alan H. Sommerstein. Loeb Classical Library No. 145. Cambridge, MA: Harvard University Press, 2009. . Online version at Harvard University Press.
 Aesop, Aesop's Fables. A new translation by Laura Gibbs. Oxford University Press (World's Classics): Oxford, 2002. Full text and index available at mythfolklore.net.
 Apollodorus, Apollodorus, The Library, with an English Translation by Sir James George Frazer, F.B.A., F.R.S. in 2 Volumes. Cambridge, MA, Harvard University Press; London, William Heinemann Ltd. 1921. Online version at the Perseus Digital Library.
 Apollonius of Rhodes, Argonautica; with an English translation by R. C. Seaton. William Heinemann, 1912.
 Apollonius Rhodius, The Argonautica of Apollonius Rhodius: Book III, edited with introduction and commentary by Marshall M. Gillies, Cambridge University Press, 1928.
 Archilochus in Elegy and Iambus. with an English Translation by. J. M. Edmonds. Cambridge, MA. Harvard University Press. London. William Heinemann Ltd. 1931. 2. Online text available at Perseus Online Library.
 Aristophanes, Clouds. The Comedies of Aristophanes. William James Hickie. London. Bohn. 1853?.
 Athenaeus, The Learned Banqueters, Volume V: Books 10.420e-11. Edited and translated by S. Douglas Olson. Loeb Classical Library 274. Cambridge, MA: Harvard University Press, 2009.
 Callimachus. Hymns, translated by Alexander William Mair (1875–1928). London: William Heinemann; New York: G.P. Putnam's Sons. 1921. Online version at the Topos Text Project.
 Claudian, Rape of Persephone in Claudian: Volume II. Translated by Platnauer, Maurice. Loeb Classical Library Volume 136. Cambridge, MA. Harvard University Press. 1922.
 Diodorus Siculus, Bibliotheca Historica. Vol 1-2. Immanel Bekker. Ludwig Dindorf. Friedrich Vogel. in aedibus B. G. Teubneri. Leipzig. 1888–1890. Greek text available at the Perseus Digital Library.
 Emperor Julian the Apostate, Against the Galileans: remains of the 3 books, excerpted from Cyril of Alexandria, Contra Julianum, (1923) pp. 319–433, translated by Wilmer Cave Wright, Ph.D.
 Euripides, Fragments: Oedipus-Chrysippus. Other Fragments. Edited and translated by Christopher Collard, Martin Cropp. Loeb Classical Library 506. Cambridge, MA: Harvard University Press, 2009.
 Euripides, Medea translated by Michael Collier and Georgia Machemer, Oxford University Press, 2006, . Google books.
 Euripides, The Complete Greek Drama', edited by Whitney J. Oates and Eugene O'Neill, Jr. in two volumes. .1. Iphigenia in Tauris, translated by Robert Potter. New York. Random House. 1938.
 Euripides, The Complete Greek Drama', edited by Whitney J. Oates and Eugene O'Neill, Jr. in two volumes. 2. The Phoenissae, translated by E. P. Coleridge. New York. Random House. 1938.
 Herodotus, Herodotus, with an English translation by A. D. Godley. Cambridge. Harvard University Press. 1920. Online version available at The Perseus Digital Library.
 Hesiod, Theogony, in The Homeric Hymns and Homerica with an English Translation by Hugh G. Evelyn-White, Cambridge, MA., Harvard University Press; London, William Heinemann Ltd. 1914. Online version at the Perseus Digital Library.
 Hesychius of Alexandria, Alphabetical Collection of All Words: Vol. III (pi through sigma), Vol. IV (tau through omega)
 Homeric Hymn 2 to Demeter in The Homeric Hymns and Homerica with an English Translation by Hugh G. Evelyn-White. Homeric Hymns. Cambridge, Massachusetts, Harvard University Press; London, William Heinemann Ltd. 1914. Online version at the Perseus Digital Library.
 Homeric Hymn 3 to Apollo in The Homeric Hymns and Homerica with an English Translation by Hugh G. Evelyn-White. Homeric Hymns. Cambridge, Massachusetts, Harvard University Press; London, William Heinemann Ltd. 1914. Online version at the Perseus Digital Library.
 Homeric Hymn 4 to Hermes in The Homeric Hymns and Homerica with an English Translation by Hugh G. Evelyn-White. Homeric Hymns. Cambridge, Massachusetts, Harvard University Press; London, William Heinemann Ltd. 1914. Online version at the Perseus Digital Library.
 Homeric Hymn 28 to Athena in The Homeric Hymns and Homerica with an English Translation by Hugh G. Evelyn-White. Homeric Hymns. Cambridge, Massachusetts, Harvard University Press; London, William Heinemann Ltd. 1914. Online version at the Perseus Digital Library.
 Homeric Hymn 31 to Helios in The Homeric Hymns and Homerica with an English Translation by Hugh G. Evelyn-White. Homeric Hymns. Cambridge, Massachusetts, Harvard University Press; London, William Heinemann Ltd. 1914. Online version at the Perseus Digital Library.
 Homer, The Iliad with an English Translation by A.T. Murray, PhD in two volumes. Cambridge, MA., Harvard University Press; London, William Heinemann, Ltd. 1924. Online version at the Perseus Digital Library.
 Homer; The Odyssey with an English Translation by A.T. Murray, PH.D. in two volumes. Cambridge, MA., Harvard University Press; London, William Heinemann, Ltd. 1919. Online version at the Perseus Digital Library.
 Hyginus, Gaius Julius, Astronomica from The Myths of Hyginus translated and edited by Mary Grant. University of Kansas Publications in Humanistic Studies. Online version at the Topos Text Project.
 Hyginus, Gaius Julius, The Myths of Hyginus. Edited and translated by Mary A. Grant, Lawrence: University of Kansas Press, 1960.
 Greek Anthology, with an English Translation by. W. R. Paton. London. William Heinemann Ltd. 1916. 1. Full text available at topostext.org.
 Isthmian odes of Pindar, edited with introduction and commentary by J. B. Bury, M.A., London, Macmillan and Co., 1892.
 Lactantius Placidus, Argumenta in Lateinische Mythographen: Lactantius Placidus, Argumente der Metamorphosen Ovids, erstes heft, Dr. B. Bunte, Bremen, 1852, J. Kühtmann & Comp.
 Libanius, Libanius's Progymnasmata: Model Exercises in Greek Prose Composition and Rhetoric. With a translation and notes by Craig A. Gibson. Society of Biblical Literature, Atalanta. 2008. 
 Longinus, On the Sublime, translated into English by H. L. Havell, with an introduction by Andrew Lang, Macmillan Publishers, London, 1890. Online text available here.
 Lucian, Dialogues of the Gods; translated by Fowler, H W and F G. Oxford: The Clarendon Press. 1905.
 Lucian, Dialogues of the Dead. Dialogues of the Sea-Gods. Dialogues of the Gods. Dialogues of the Courtesans, translated by M. D. MacLeod, Loeb Classical Library No. 431, Cambridge, Massachusetts, Harvard University Press, 1961. . Online version at Harvard University Press. Internet Archive.
 Lucian, Icaromenippus in The Downward Journey or The Tyrant. Zeus Catechized. Zeus Rants. The Dream or The Cock. Prometheus. Icaromenippus or The Sky-man. Timon or The Misanthrope. Charon or The Inspectors. Philosophies for Sale. Translated by A. M. Harmon. Loeb Classical Library 54. Cambridge, MA: Harvard University Press, 1915.
 Lucian, Lucian's A True Story: an Intermediate Greek reader, Greek text with running vocabulary and commentary, Evan Hayes, Stephen A. Nimis, 2011. 
 Lucian, The Dream or the Cock in The Downward Journey or The Tyrant. Zeus Catechized. Zeus Rants. The Dream or The Cock. Prometheus. Icaromenippus or The Sky-man. Timon or The Misanthrope. Charon or The Inspectors. Philosophies for Sale. Translated by A. M. Harmon. Loeb Classical Library 54. Cambridge, MA: Harvard University Press, 1915.
 Lycophron, Alexandra (or Cassandra) in Callimachus and Lycophron with an English translation by A. W. Mair ; Aratus, with an English translation by G. R. Mair, London: W. Heinemann, New York: G. P. Putnam 1921 . Internet Archive
 Maurus Servius Honoratus, In Vergilii carmina comentarii. Servii Grammatici qui feruntur in Vergilii carmina commentarii; recensuerunt Georgius Thilo et Hermannus Hagen. Georgius Thilo. Leipzig. B. G. Teubner. 1881. Online version at the Perseus Digital Library.
 Mesomedes in Lyra Græca: Specimens of the Greek Lyric Poets, from Callinus to Soutsos. Edited, with critical Notes, and a biographical Introduction, by James Donaldson (Edinburgh & London, 1854) p. 96f.
 Nonnus, Dionysiaca; translated by Rouse, W H D, I Books I-XV. Loeb Classical Library No. 344, Cambridge, Massachusetts, Harvard University Press; London, William Heinemann Ltd. 1940. Internet Archive
 Nonnus, Dionysiaca; translated by Rouse, W H D, II Books XVI-XXXV. Loeb Classical Library No. 345, Cambridge, Massachusetts, Harvard University Press; London, William Heinemann Ltd. 1940. Internet Archive
 Nonnus, Dionysiaca; translated by Rouse, W H D, III Books XXXVI–XLVIII. Loeb Classical Library No. 346, Cambridge, Massachusetts, Harvard University Press; London, William Heinemann Ltd. 1940. Internet Archive.
 Orphic Argonautica with a translation by Jason Calavito. Published by Jason Calavito, Albany, New York, 2011. Full text available online at argonauts-book.com.
 Ovid, Fasti: With an English translation by Sir James George Frazer, London: W. Heinemann LTD; Cambridge, Massachusetts, Harvard University Press, 1959. Internet Archive.
 Ovid. Metamorphoses, Volume I: Books 1-8. Translated by Frank Justus Miller. Revised by G. P. Goold. Loeb Classical Library No. 42. Cambridge, Massachusetts: Harvard University Press, 1977, first published 1916. . Online version at Harvard University Press.
 Palaephatus in Early Greek Philosophy, Volume I: Introductory and Reference Materials. Edited and translated by André Laks, Glenn W. Most. Loeb Classical Library 524. Cambridge, MA: Harvard University Press, 2016.
 Palladas, in The Greek Anthology, Volume IV: Book 10: The Hortatory and Admonitory Epigrams. Book 11: The Convivial and Satirical Epigrams. Book 12: Strato's Musa Puerilis. Translated by W. R. Paton. Loeb Classical Library 85. Cambridge, MA: Harvard University Press, 1918.
 Paradoxographoe, by Anton Westermann, Harvard College Library, 1839, London.
 Pausanias, Pausanias Description of Greece with an English Translation by W.H.S. Jones, Litt.D., and H.A. Ormerod, M.A., in 4 Volumes. Cambridge, MA, Harvard University Press; London, William Heinemann Ltd. 1918. Online version at the Perseus Digital Library.
 Philostratus, Imagines, translated by A. Fairbanks, Loeb Classical Library No, 256. Harvard University Press, Cambridge, Massachusetts. 1931. . Internet Archive
 Pindar, Odes, Diane Arnson Svarlien. 1990. Online version at the Perseus Digital Library.
 Pindar, The Odes of Pindar including the Principal Fragments with an Introduction and an English Translation by Sir John Sandys, Litt.D., FBA. Cambridge, MA., Harvard University Press; London, William Heinemann Ltd. 1937. Greek text available at the Perseus Digital Library.
 Plato, Laws in Plato in Twelve Volumes, Vols. 10 & 11 translated by R.G. Bury. Cambridge, MA, Harvard University Press; London, William Heinemann Ltd. 1967 & 1968. Online text available at Perseus Digital Library.
 Plato, Plato's statesman: A translation of The Politicus of Plato, with introductory essays and footnotes., & Skemp, J. B. (1952) New Haven: Yale University Press.
 Pliny the Elder, Pliny – Natural History, 10 volumes. Translated by Rackham, H.; Jones, W. H. S.; Eichholz, D. E. Loeb Classical Library. 1938–1962.
 Plutarch, Moralia. 16 vols. (vol. 13: 13.1 & 13.2, vol. 16: index), transl. by Frank Cole Babbitt (vol. 1–5) et al., series: "Loeb Classical Library" (LCL, vols. 197–499). Cambridge, Massachusetts: Harvard University Press et al., 1927–2004.
 Porphyry, On Abstinence From Animal Food in Select works of Porphyry: Containing his four books On abstinence from animal food; his treatise On the Homeric cave of the nymphs; and his Auxiliaries to the perception of intelligible natures. Translated by Thomas Taylor (1823). Several reprints; Prometheus Trust (1994).
 Quintus Smyrnaeus, Quintus Smyrnaeus: The Fall of Troy, translated by A.S. Way, Cambridge, Massachusetts, Harvard University Press, 1913. Internet Archive.
 Scholia Aristophanica; being such comments adscript to the text of Aristophanes as have been preserved in the Codex Ravennas, arr., emended, and translated by Rutherford, William Gunion, 1853–1907, ed. and tr; Biblioteca comunale classense (Ravenna, Italy).
 Seneca, Tragedies, translated by Miller, Frank Justus. Loeb Classical Library Volumes. Cambridge, Massachusetts, Harvard University Press; London, William Heinemann Ltd. 1917.
 Sophocles. Fragments. Edited and translated by Hugh Lloyd-Jones. Loeb Classical Library 483. Cambridge, MA: Harvard University Press, 1996.
 Sophocles, The Ajax of Sophocles. Edited with introduction and notes by Sir Richard Jebb. Sir Richard Jebb. Cambridge. Cambridge University Press, 1893.
 Sophocles, The Oedipus Plays of Sophocles: Oedipus the King, Oedipus at Colonos, Antigone, with a translation by Paul Roche. New York: Plume, 2004.
 Statius, Thebaid. Translated by Mozley, J H. Loeb Classical Library Volumes. Cambridge, Massachusetts, Harvard University Press; London, William Heinemann Ltd. 1928.
 Strabo, The Geography of Strabo. Edition by H.L. Jones. Cambridge, Mass.: Harvard University Press; London: William Heinemann, Ltd. 1924. Online version at the Perseus Digital Library.
 Theocritus in Greek Bucolic Poets. Edited and translated by Neil Hopkinson. Loeb Classical Library 28. Cambridge, MA: Harvard University Press, 1912. Online text available at theoi.com.
 Tzetzes, John, Book of Histories, Book II-IV translated by Gary Berkowitz from the original Greek of T. Kiessling's edition of 1826. Online version available at Theoi.com.
 Tzetzes, John, Chiliades, editor Gottlieb Kiessling, F.C.G. Vogel, 1826. Google Books. (English translation: Book I by Ana Untila; Books II–IV, by Gary Berkowitz; Books V–VI by Konstantino Ramiotis; Books VII–VIII by Vasiliki Dogani; Books IX–X by Jonathan Alexander; Books XII–XIII by Nikolaos Giallousis. Internet Archive).
 Valerius Flaccus, Argonautica translated by Mozley, J H. Loeb Classical Library Volume 286. Cambridge, MA, Harvard University Press; London, William Heinemann Ltd. 1928. Online version at Theoi.com.
 Vergil, Aeneid. Theodore C. Williams. trans. Boston. Houghton Mifflin Co. 1910. Online version at the Perseus Digital Library.
 Xenophon's Ephesian History: or the Love-Adventures of Abrocomas and Anthia, in Five Books'. Translated from the Greek by Mr. Rooke [the Second Edition], London: Printed for J. Millan at Locke's Head in Shug-Lane; 1727, pp. 87–112.

 Secondary sources 

 1742 libretto: Phaeton, Tragedie représentée pour la première fois à Versailles devant le Roi, le mercredi 6 janvier 1683 et à Paris (...) Remise au théâtre le mardi 13 novembre 1742. Paris: Ballard.
 Athanassakis, Apostolos N., and Benjamin M. Wolkow, The Orphic Hymns, Johns Hopkins University Press, 2013) . Google Books.
 Barnhart, Robert K., The Barnhart Concise Dictionary of Etymology, 1995, HarperCollins, .
 Beaulieu, Marie-Claire, The Sea in the Greek Imagination, University of California Press, 2016, . Google books.
 Beck, Hans, Localism and the Ancient Greek City-State, University of Chicago Press, 2020, . Google books.
 
 Bell, Robert E., Women of Classical Mythology: A Biographical Dictionary, ABC-CLIO 1991, . Internet Archive.
 Berens, E. M., The Myths and Legends of Ancient Greece and Rome, Blackie & Son, Old Bailey, E.C., Glasgow, Endinburgh and Dublin. 1880.
 Bonfant, Larissa, Swaddling, Judith, Etruscan myths. The legendary past. London and Austin, TX: University of Texas Press, 2006. 80 pages : illustrations, map ; 25 cm. 
 Bortolani, Ljuba Merlina, Magical Hymns from Roman Egypt: A Study of Greek and Egyptian Traditions of Divinity, Cambridge University Press, 2016, .
 Boyle, A. J., Seneca: Medea: Edited with Introduction, Translation, and Commentary, Oxford University Press, Oxford, 2014, 
 Bull, Malcolm, The Mirror of the Gods, How Renaissance Artists Rediscovered the Pagan Gods, Oxford University Press, 2005, .
 
 Caldwell, Richard, Hesiod's Theogony, Focus Publishing/R. Pullins Company (June 1, 1987). .
 
 Chrystal, Paul, War in Greek Mythology, 2020, Pen & Sword Military, .
 Classical Manual: Or a Mythological, Historical and Geographical Commentary on Pope's Homer and Dryden's Aeneid of Virgil, with a Copious Index, London, printed by A. J. Valpy, M. A. For Longman, Rees, Orme, Brown, and Green. 1827.
 Cohen, Beth, White Ground, in The Colors of Clay: Special Techniques in Athenian Vases, Getty Publications, 2006, .
 Collard Christopher, Cropp Martin, Lee Kevin H.; Euripides: Selected Fragmentary Plays: Volume I, Oxbow Books, United Kingdom, 1995, .
 Collignon, Maxime, Manual of Mythology, in Relation to Greek Art, University of Michigan, 1890.
 Collins, Derek, Magic in the Ancient Greek World, Blackwell Publishing, 2008, .
 Cook, Arthur Bernard, Zeus: A Study in Ancient Religion, Volume I: Zeus God of the Bright Sky, Cambridge University Press 1914. Internet Archive.
 Cosgrove, Denis E. and Cosgrove, Carmen P., Apollo's Eye: A Cartographic Genealogy of the Earth in the Western Imagination, the Johns Hopkins University Press, 2001, .
 Davidson, James, "Time and Greek Religion", in A Companion to Greek Religion, edited by Daniel Ogden, John Wiley & Sons, 2010, .
 Decharme, Paul, Mythologie de la Grèce antique, Garnier Frères, 1884. Google books (in French).
 
 Diggle, James, Euripides: Phaethon, Cambridge University Press, Cambridge Classical Texts and Commentaries, Series Number 12, 1970, .
 Dillon, Matthew, Girls and Women in Classical Greek Religion, Routledge, 2002, .
 Dillon, Matthew, Omens and Oracles: Divination in Ancient Greece, Routledge, 2017, .
 Dunbabin, Katherine M. D., Mosaics of the Greek and Roman World, Cambridge University Press, Edinburgh, 1999, .
 Ekroth, Gunnel, The Sacrificial Rituals of Greek Hero-Cults in the Archaic to the Early Hellenistic Period, Presses universitaires de Liège, 2013, .
 Fairbanks, Arthur, The Mythology of Greece and Rome. D. Appleton–Century Company, New York, 1907.
 Faita, Antonia-Stella, The Great Altar of Pergamon: The Monument in its Historical and Cultural Context, 2000, University of Bristol. Internet Archive.
 Faraone, Christopher A., Ancient Greek Love Magic, Harvard University Press, 1999, .
 Faraone, Christopher A. and Obbink, Dirk, Magika Hiera: Ancient Greek Magic and Religion, Oxford University Press, 1991, .
 Farnell, Lewis Richard, The Cults of the Greek States vol. ΙV, Cambridge University Press, 2010, .
 Farnell, Lewis Richard, The Cults of the Greek States: Volume 5, January 1977, ThriftBooks-Baltimore, 
 
 Fletcher, Judith, Performing Oaths in Classical Greek Drama, Cambridge University Press 2012, New York, .
 Foley, Helene, The Homeric Hymn to Demeter: Translation, Commentary, and Interpretive Essays, Princeton University Press, Princeton, 1993, .
 
 Fowler, R. L. (2000), Early Greek Mythography: Volume 1: Text and Introduction, Oxford University Press, Oxford, 2000. .
 Fowler, R. L. (2013), Early Greek Mythography: Volume 2: Commentary, Oxford University Press, 2013. .
 Gantz, Timothy, Early Greek myth: A Guide to Literary and Artistic Sources, 1993, The Johns Hopkins University Press, Baltimore, .
 Gantz, Timothy, Early Greek Myth: A Guide to Literary and Artistic Sources, Johns Hopkins University Press, 1996, Two volumes:  (Vol. 1),  (Vol. 2).
 Gardner, Percy; Jevons, Frank Byron, A Manual of Greek Antiquities, University of Wisconsin, 1895, Charles Scribner's Sons.
 Gelling, Peter; Davidson Hilda Ellis, Chariot of the Sun and Other Rites and Symbols of the Northern Bronze Age, Aldine Paperbacks, 1972, .
 
 Grimal, Pierre, The Dictionary of Classical Mythology, Wiley-Blackwell, 1996. .
 de Grummond, Nancy T., From Pergamon to Sperlonga: Sculpture and Context. University of California Press, Los Angeles, United States, 2000. 
 Guillermier Pierre; Koutchmy Serge, Total Eclipses: Science, Observations, Myths and Legends, Praxis Publishing, 1999, .
 Guthrie, W. K. C., Orpheus and Greek Religion: A Study of the Orphic Movement, Princeton University Press, 1935. . Google books.
 Hamilton, Edith, Mythology. Grand Central Publishing. Chicago. Hamilton, Edith. 2011. Mythology. London, England: Grand Central Publishing.
 Hansen, William F., Handbook of Classical Mythology, ABC-CLIO, Inc. 2004. .
 Ḥaḵlîlî, Rāḥēl, Ancient Mosaic Pavements: Themes, Issues, and Trends: Selected Studies, Brill Publications, 2009, Boston, .
 Hall, James, Dictionary of Subjects and Symbols in Art, second edition, 2018, Routledge publications, .
 Hard, Robin, The Routledge Handbook of Greek Mythology: Based on H.J. Rose's "Handbook of Greek Mythology", Psychology Press, 2004, . Google Books.
 
 Harrison, Juliette, Dreams and Dreaming in the Roman Empire: Cultural Memory and Imagination, 2013, Bloomsbury, .
 Harris-Warrick Rebecca, Dance and Drama in French Baroque Opera, Cambridge University Press, 2016, .
 
 Hauptmann, Gerhart, Ährenlese, SAGA Egmont, 1939, .
 Hemingway, Seán, How to Read Greek Sculpture, published by the Metropolitan Museum of Art, New York City, 2021, .
 
 Impelluso, Lucia, Gods and Heroes in Art, translated by Thomas Michael Hartmann, 2002 (English translation), Getty Publications for the United States.
 Inman, Thomas, Ancient faiths embodied in ancient names: or, An attempt to trace the religious belief, sacred rites, and holy emblems of certain nations, volume 1, second edition, 1872, Trübner and Co.
 
 Keightley, Thomas, The Mythology of Ancient Greece and Italy, second edition considerably enlarged and improved, London, Whittaker and Co., 1838.
 
  et passim.
 Kilinski, Karl, Greek Myth and Western Art: The Presence of the Past, Cambridge University Press, New York City, 2013, .
 
 Knight, Virginia, The Renewal of Epic: Responses to Homer in the Argonautica of Apollonius, Brill Publishers, 1995, .
 Kraemer, Ross Shepard, When Aseneth Met Joseph: A Late Antique Tale of the Biblical Patriarch and His Egyptian Wife, Reconsidered, Oxford University Press, New York City, 1998, .
 Kristiansen, Kristian; Larsson, Thomas B. (2005). The Rise of Bronze Age Society: Travels, Transmissions and Transformations. Cambridge University Press. 
 Lalonde, Gerald V., Horos Dios: An Athenian Shrine and Cult of Zeus, Brill Publishers, Boston, 2006, .
 Larson, Jennifer, A Land Full of Gods: Nature Deities in Greek Religion, In A Companion to Greek Religion, D. Ogden (Ed.), 2007.
 Larson, Jennifer, Ancient Greek Cults: A Guide, Routledge, 2007, .
 Larson, Jennifer Lynn, Greek Heroine Cults, the University of Wisconsin Press, 1995, .
 Larson, Jennifer, Greek Nymphs: Myth, Cult, Lore, Oxford University Press, 2001, .
 Lecerf, Adrien, Iamblichus and Julian's "Third Demiurge": A Proposition in Afonasin, Eugene; Dillon, John M. Dillon; Finamore, John, Iamblichus and the Foundations of Late Platonism, Brill Publications, 2012, .
 Le Comte, Edward, Poets' Riddles: Essays in Seventeenth-century Explication, Port Washington, N.Y. : Kennikat Press, 1975.
 Loney, Alexander C., The Ethics of Revenge and the Meanings of the Odyssey, Oxford University Press, 2018, .
 Long, Charlotte R., The Twelve Gods of Greece and Rome with a frontispiece, 101 plates and two maps, Brill Publishers, 1987, . Google books.
 Lupu, Eran, Greek Sacred Law: A Collection of New Documents (NGSL), Leiden, Brill Publications, Netherlands, 2005, .
 MacDonald Kirkwood, Gordon, A Short Guide to Classical Mythology. Cornell University. 2000. Bolchazy-Carducci Publishers, Inc.
 Madigan, Brian Christopher, Monumenta Graeca et Romana: Corinthian and Attic vases in the Detroit Institute of Arts, Boston, Brill Publications, 2008. .
 Mallory, J. P.; Adams, D. Q., Encyclopedia of Indo-European Culture, Fitzroy Dearborn Publishers, 1997, .
 Malkin, Irad, Religion and Colonization in Ancient Greece, 1987, .
 March, Jennifer R., Dictionary of Classical Mythology. Illustrations by Neil Barrett, Cassel & Co., 1998. .
 
 Matthews, Victor J., Panyassis of Halikarnassos: Text and Commentary, Brill Publications, Leiden, 1974, .
 Mayerson, Philip, Classical Mythology in Literature, Art, and Music, Focus publishing, R. Pullins Company, 2001. .
 Meagher, Robert E., The Meaning of Helen: In Search of an Ancient Icon, Bolchazy-Carducci Publishers, 2002. .
 Meisner, Dwayne A., Orphic Tradition and the Birth of the Gods, Oxford University Press, 2018, .
 Mikalson, Jon D., Honor Thy Gods: Popular Religion in Greek Tragedy, The University of North Carolina Press, 1991, .
 Miles, Margaret L., Autopsy in Athens: Recent Archaeological Research on Athens and Attica, Oxbow Books, London, 2015, .
 Miller, John F. and Newlands, Carole E., A Handbook to the Reception of Ovid, Wiley Blackwell, 2014, .
 Miller, Stella G., Two Groups of Thessalian Gold, Volume 18, University of California Press, 1979, .
 Mitchell, Lucy M., "Sculptures of the Great Pergamon Altar" in The Century Magazine, 1883.
 Morris, Ian, Classical Greece: Ancient Histories and Modern Archaeologies, Cambridge University Press, 1994. .
 Müller, Karl Wilhelm Ludwig, Fragmenta Historicorum Graecorum, Volume I, 1841. Internet Archive.* Müller, Karl Wilhelm Ludwig, Fragmenta Historicorum Graecorum, Volume I, 1841. Internet Archive.
 Murray, Alexander Stuart; Klapp William H., Handbook of World Mythology, Dover Publications, Inc. Mineola, New York. 2005. 
 Nagy, Gregory, Greek Mythology and Poetics, Cornell University Press, 1990, .
 Nawotka, Krzysztof, The Alexander Romance by Ps.-Callisthenes: A Historical Commentary, Brill Publishers, 2017, . Google books.
 Neils, The Parthenon: From Antiquity to the Present, Cambridge University Press, 2005. .
 Nilsson, Martin, Griechische Feste von religiöser Bedeutung, mit Ausschluss der attischen, 1906. Internet Archive.
 
 Notopoulos, James A., Socrates and the Sun, The Classical Association of the Middle West and South, Inc., 1942.
 Numen: International Review for the History of Religions, vol. 51, no. 4, Brill, 2004, E. Thomassen, M. Despland and G. Benavides. Boston.
 Ogden, Daniel, Greek and Roman Necromancy, 2001, Princeton University Press, .
 Olderr, Steven, Symbolism: A Comprehensive Dictionary, second edition, McFarland & Company, Inc 2012; United States .
 Oxford Classical Dictionary, fourth edition, Simon Hornblower and Anthony Spawforth (editors), Oxford University Press, 2012. . Google books.
 Paipetis S. A., Science and Technology in Homeric Epics, University of Patras, 2008, Patras, Greece. .
 Palagia, Olga, The Pediments of the Parthenon, BRILL, 1998. .
 Parker, Robert, Polytheism and Society at Athens, Oxford University Press, 2005. .
 Parvopassu, Clelia, Phaéton, in Gelli, Piero & Poletti, Filippo (ed), Dizionario dell'opera 2008, Milan, Baldini Castoldi Dalai, 2007, .
 Patton, Kimberley Christine, Religion of the Gods: Ritual, Paradox, and Reflexivity, Oxford University Press, USA, 2009.
 
 Picón, Carlos A.; Hemingway, Seán, Pergamon and the Hellenistic Kingdoms of the Ancient World, Yale University Press, 2016, .
 Platt, Verity; Squire, Michael, The Frame in Classical Art: A Cultural History, Cambridge University Press, 2017, .
 Powell, Barry B., Greek Poems to the Gods: Hymns from Homer to Proclus, University of California Press, 2021, .
 Powell, John Scott, Music and Theatre in France, 1600-1680, Oxford University Press, 2000.
 Rahner, Hugo, Greek Myths and Christian Mystery, Biblo-Moser, June 1, 1963, .
 Ridgeway, Brunilde Sismondo, Hellenistic Sculpture II: The Styles of ca. 200–100 B.C., The University of Wisconsin Press, 2000.
 Riggs, Christina, The Oxford Handbook of Roman Egypt, Oxford University Press, 2012, .
 Roberts, Helene E., Encyclopedia of Comparative Iconography: Themes Depicted in Works of Art. Volume I and II, Fitzroy Dearborn Publishers, London, Chicago, 1998. .
 Robertson, Martin (1981), A Shorter History of Greek Art, Cambridge University Press. .
 Robertson, Martin (1992), The Art of Vase-Painting in Classical Athens, Cambridge University Press. .
 Roisman, Joseph; Worthington, Ian, A Companion to Ancient Macedonia, Blackwell Companions to the Ancient World, Wiley-Blackwell, 2010, . Google books.
 Rose, H. J., A Handbook of Greek Mythology, Methuen and Co. Ltd. London and New York, 1928. 
 Roscher, Wilhelm Heinrich, Ausführliches Lexikon der griechischen und römischen Mythologie (Leipzig: Teubner, 1890–94), Volume II, part 1.
 Rutherford, Ian, Pindar's Paeans: A Reading of the Fragments with a Survey of the Genre, Oxford University Press, New York, 2001. .
 Salatino, Kevin; Folds, Suzanne, Gray Collection: Pure Drawing, 2020, the Art Institute of Chicago, .
 
 Savignoni, L. 1899. "On Representations of Helios and of Selene." The Journal of Hellenic Studies 19': pp. 265–272
 
 Seaton, Beverly, The Language of Flowers: A History, University Press of Virginia, 1995, .Google books.
 Seydle, Jon L., Giambattista Tiepolo: Fifteen Oil Sketches, 2005, Getty Publications, .
 Seyffert, Oskar, A Dictionary of Classical Antiquities, Mythology, Religion, Literature and Art, from the German of Dr. Oskar Seyffert, S. Sonnenschein, 1901. Internet Archive.
 Smith, Helaine L., Masterpieces of Classic Greek Drama, Greenwood Press, 2006, .
 Smith, William; Dictionary of Greek and Roman Biography and Mythology, London (1873)."Helios".
 Sommerstein, Alan H.; Bayliss, Andrew James, Oath and State in Ancient Greece, Walter de Gruyter publications, Berlin, 2013, .
 Steinberg, Aliza, Weaving in Stones: Garments and Their Accessories in the Mosaic Art of Eretz Israel in Late Antiquity, Archaeopress Publishing, 2020, .
 Stoneman, Richard; Erickson, Kyle; Netton, Ian Richard, The Alexander Romance in Persia and the East, 2012, .
 Stoneman, Richard, Greek Mythology: An Encyclopedia of Myth and Legend, Diamond Books, 1995.
 Stoll, Heinrich Wilhelm, Handbook of the religion and mythology of the Greeks, With a Short Account of The Religious System of the Romans, tr. by R.B. Paul, and ed. by T.K. Arnold, London, Francis & John Rivington, 1852.
 
 The Classical Review, volume VII, University of Illinois Library, 1893.
 The Nineteenth Century, Volume 17, edited by James Knowles, January–June 1885, London, Harvard College Library.
 Thonemann, Peter, An Ancient Dream Manual: Artemidorus' The Interpretation of Dreams, Oxford University Press, 2020, .
 .
 Torr, Cecil, Rhodes in Ancient Times, Cambridge University Press, 1885.
 Tsagalis, Christos, Early Greek Epic Fragments I: Antiquarian and Genealogical Epic De Gruyter, 2017, .
 Usener, Herman, Göttliche Synonyme in Kleine Schriften, Cambridge University Press, 2010, . Google books.
 
 van den Berg, Robbert Maarten, Proclus' Hymns: Essays, Translations, Commentary, 2001, .
 Vergados, Athanassios, The "Homeric Hymn to Hermes": Introduction, Text and Commentary, Walter de Gruyter, 2012. .
 Vermaseren, M. J, Graecia atque Insulae, Brill Publications, Leiden, 1982, .
 Versnel, H.S., Inconsistencies in Greek and Roman Religion: Transition and Reversal in Myth and Ritual: Volume 1: Ter Unus. Isis, Dionysos, Hermes. Three Studies in Henotheism, Brill Publications, 2015, .
 Walters, Henry Beauchamp, History of ancient pottery, Greek, Etruscan, and Roman volume II, based on the work of Samuel Birch, 1905, London, J. Murray, New York.
 Walton, Alice, The Cult of Asclepius, Ginn and Company, 1894.
 Warrior, Valerie M., Greek Religion: A Sourcebook, 2009, .
 Waterfield, Robin, The Greek Myths: Stories of the Greek Gods and Heroes Vividly Retold, 2011, Quercus, . Online text available at Internet Archive.
 West, M. L., Indo-European Poetry and Myth, Oxford University Press, 2007. . Google Books.
 Xenis, Georgios A., Scholia vetera in Sophoclis "Oedipum Coloneum", De Gruyter, 2018. .
 Zucker, Arnaud; Le Feuvre, Claire, Ancient and Medieval Greek Etymology: Theory and Practice I, De Gruyter, .
 

 Further reading 
 Weitzmann, Kurt, ed., Age of spirituality : late antique and early Christian art, third to seventh century'', no. 59, 1979, Metropolitan Museum of Art, New York, ; full text available online from The Metropolitan Museum of Art Libraries.
 The translation and reconstruction of Euripides' "Phaethon" made by Vlanes is now available as ebook on Amazon.

External links 

 HELIOS on The Theoi Project
 HELIOS on Greek Mythology Link
 HELIOS in greekmythology.com
 HELIOS from Mythopedia
 TITAN from The Theoi Project

 
Greek gods
Solar gods
Sol Invictus
Deities in the Iliad
Characters in the Odyssey
Metamorphoses characters
Personifications in Greek mythology
Rape of Persephone
Titans (mythology)
Cattle in religion
Horse deities
Characters in the Argonautica
Solar chariot
Light gods
Deities in the Aeneid
Rhodian mythology
Oaths
Consorts of Selene
Magic gods
Consorts of Gaia
Mythology of Heracles
Dreams in religion
Deeds of Aphrodite
Shapeshifters in Greek mythology
Consorts of Demeter